= Shadbolt =

Shadbolt is a surname. Notable people with the name include:

- Abbie Shadbolt (1887–1971), New Zealand rugby player
- Blunden Shadbolt (1879–1949), British architect
- Caitlyn Shadbolt (born 1996), Australian singer/songwriter
- Cecil Shadbolt (1859–1892), British photographer, pioneer of aerial photography from hot air balloons; son of George
- Doris Shadbolt (1918–2003), Canadian art curator and writer
- Ernest Shadbolt (1851–1936), British engineer and proponent of public open space
- Gary Shadbolt, English weightlifter
- George Shadbolt (1817–1901), British writer, photographer and botanist; father of Cecil
- Jack Shadbolt (1909–1998), Canadian painter
- Joe Shadbolt (1874–1967), English football player
- Ken Shadbolt (1921–2012), Australian football player
- Kylie Shadbolt (born 1972), Australian artistic gymnast
- Loomis Shadbolt (1883–1963), American politician
- Maurice Shadbolt (1932–2004), New Zealand writer and playwright
- Nicola Shadbolt, New Zealand farmer, academic and company director
- Nigel Shadbolt (born 1956), British artificial intelligence expert
- René Shadbolt (1903–1977), New Zealand military nurse and hospital matron
- Tim Shadbolt (1947–2026), New Zealand politician

== Fictional ==
- Norman Shadbolt, character in Home and Away

== See also ==
- Mount Shadbolt
