= Aerial photography =

Taking images of the ground from the air

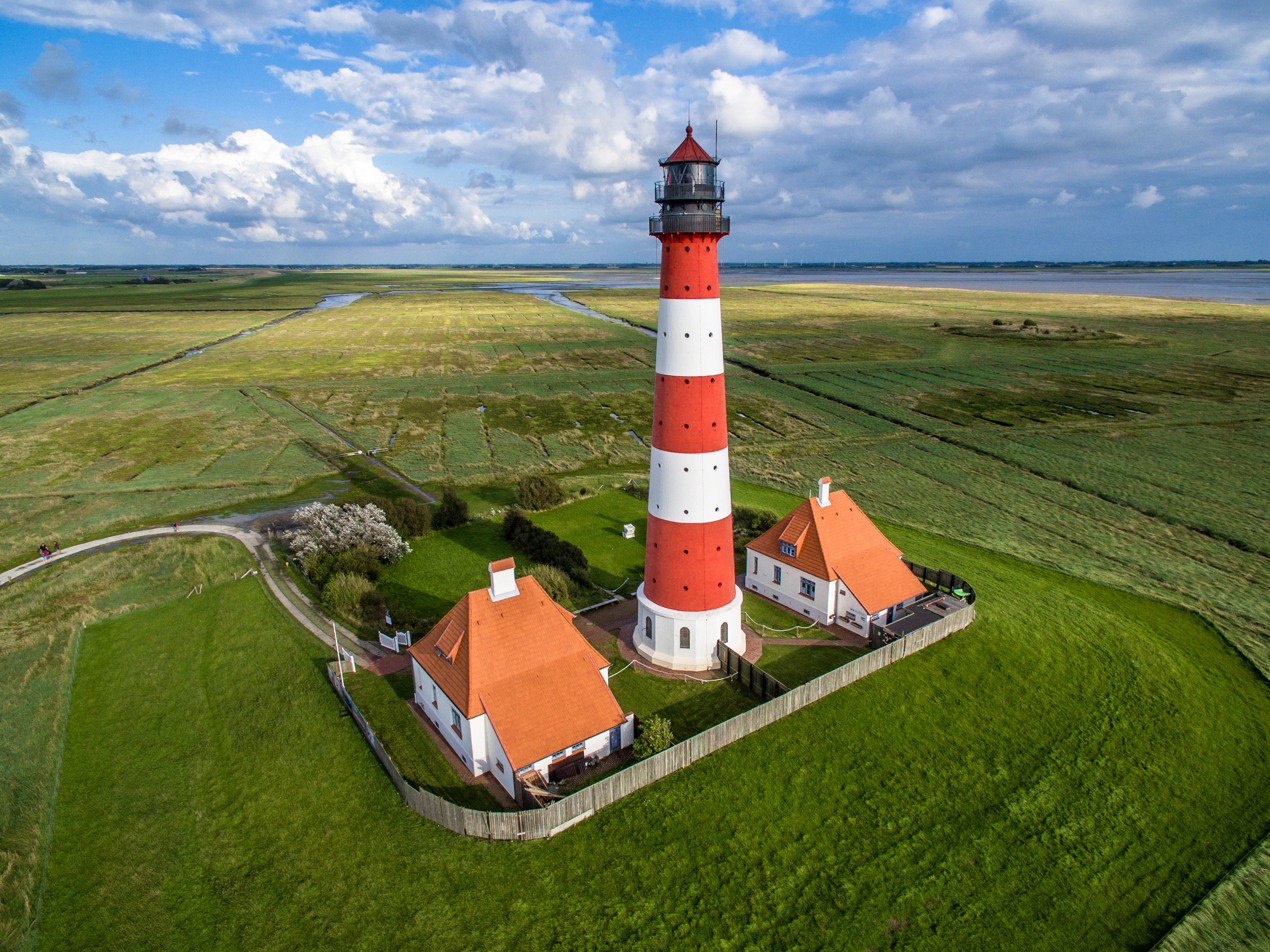
An aerial photograph using a drone of Westerheversand Lighthouse, Germany

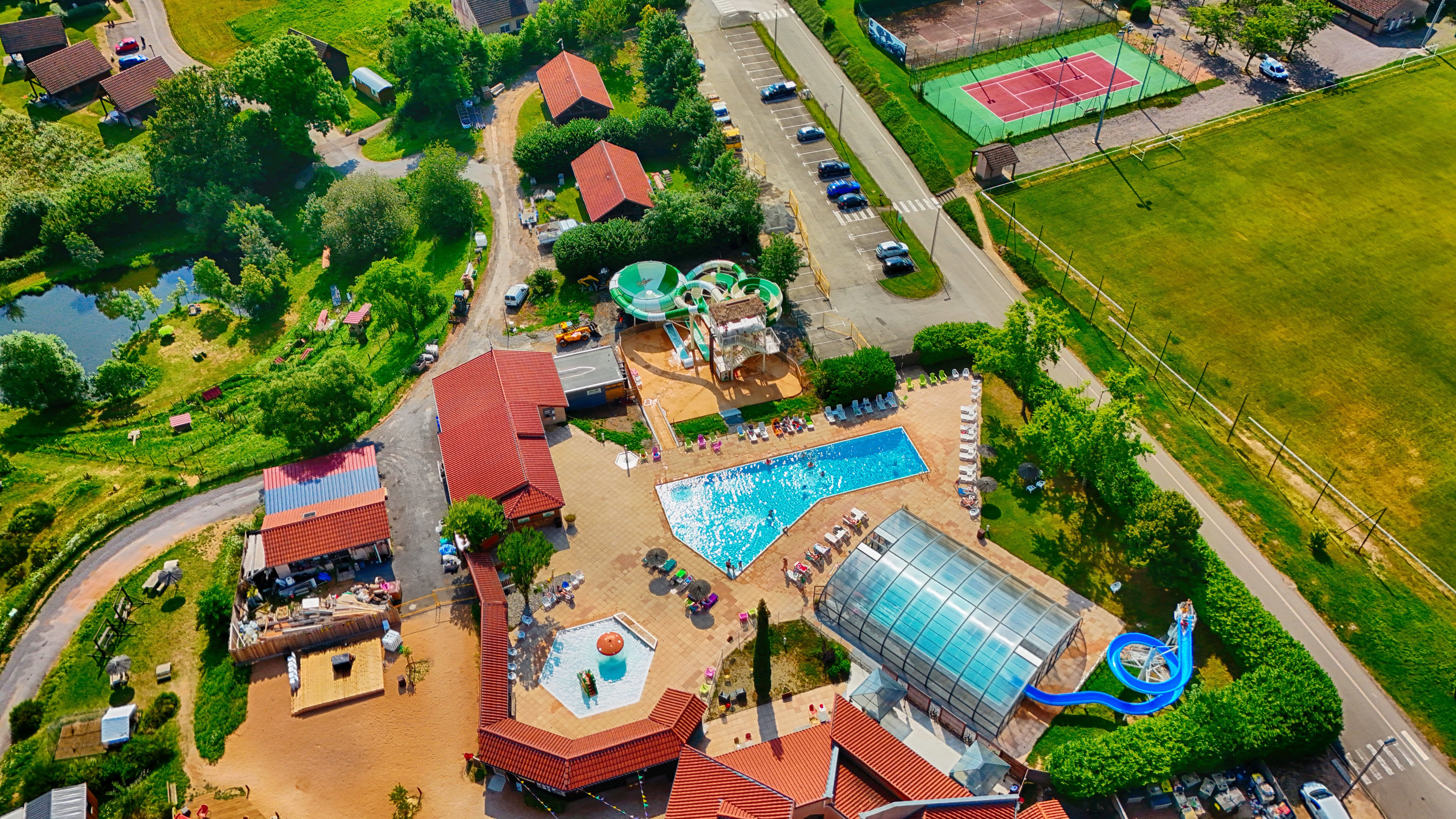
Aerial view of a swimming pool complex

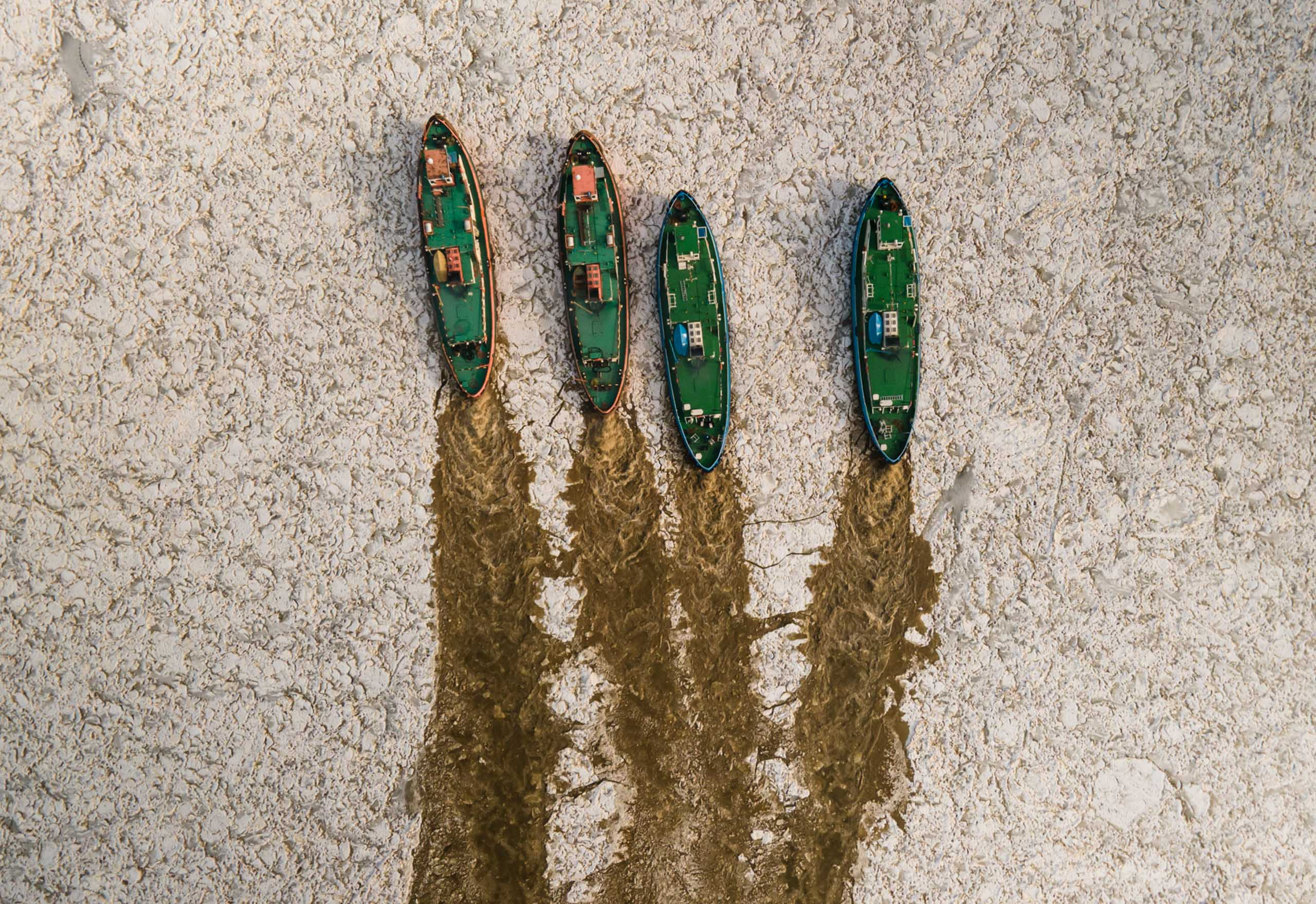
An aerial photograph taken using a drone of the Vistula, a river in Poland

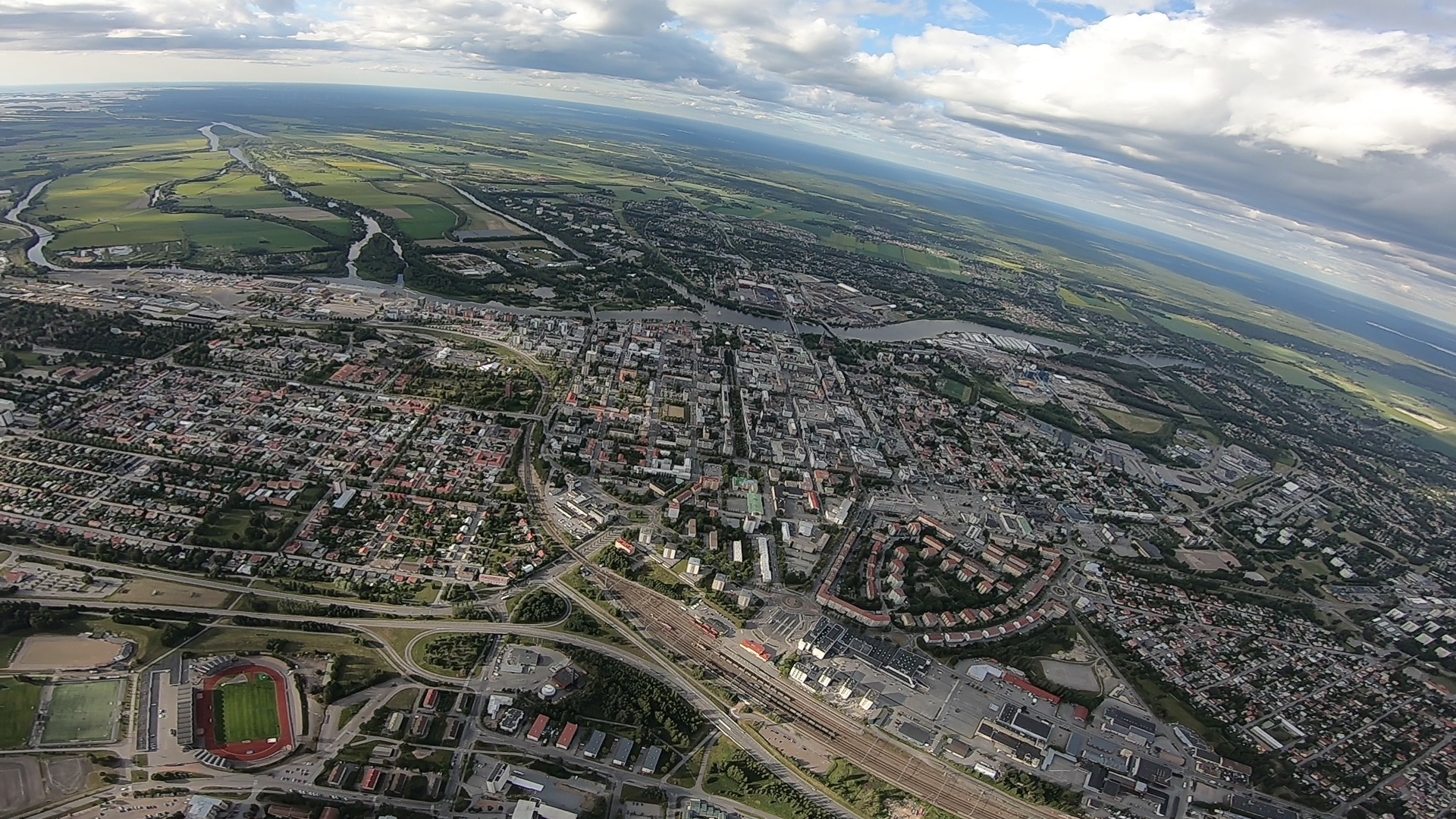
An aerial view of the city of Pori, Finland

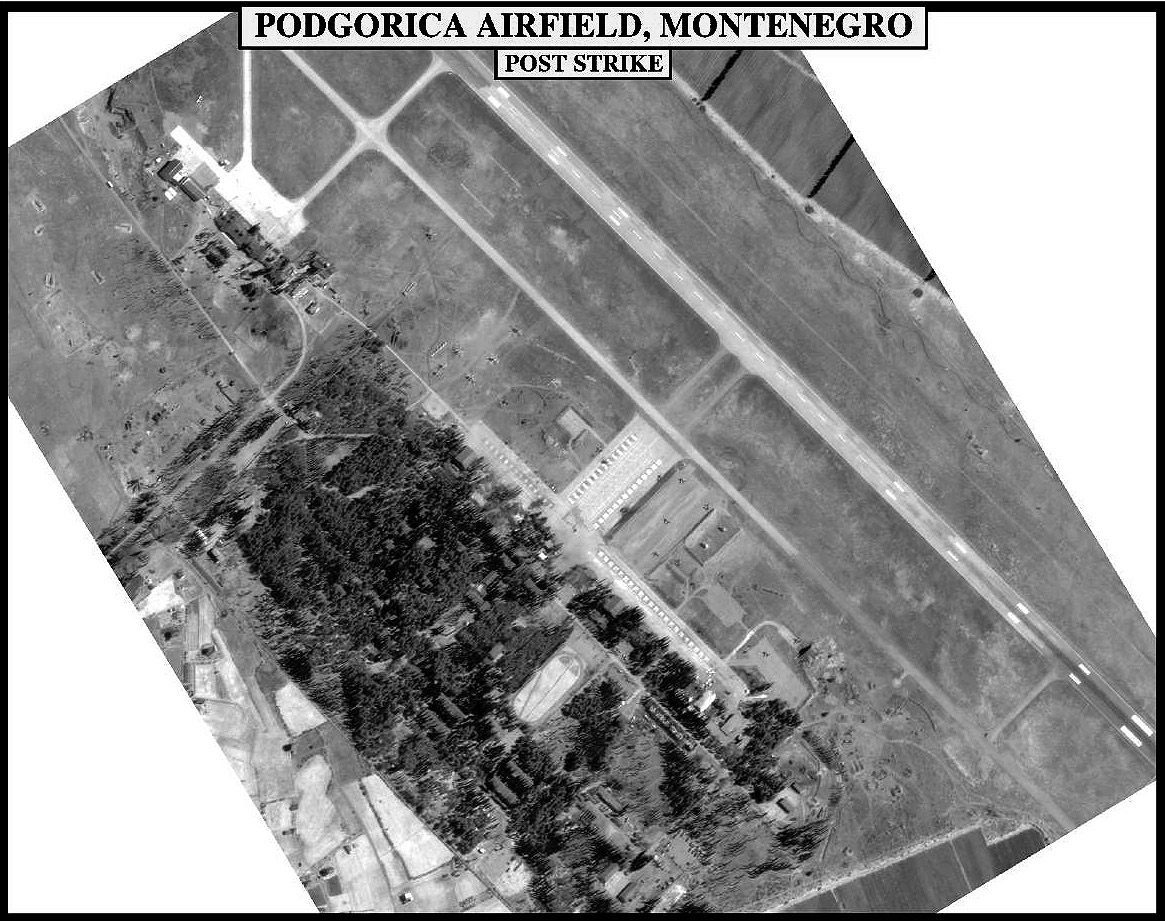
Air photo of a military target used to evaluate the effect of bombing

Aerial photography (or airborne imagery) is the taking of photographs from an aircraft or other airborne platforms. When taking motion pictures, it is also known as aerial videography.

Platforms for aerial photography include fixed-wing aircraft, helicopters, unmanned aerial vehicles (UAVs or "drones"), balloons, blimps and dirigibles, rockets, pigeons, kites, or using action cameras while skydiving or wingsuiting. Handheld cameras may be manually operated by the photographer, while mounted cameras are usually remotely operated or triggered automatically.

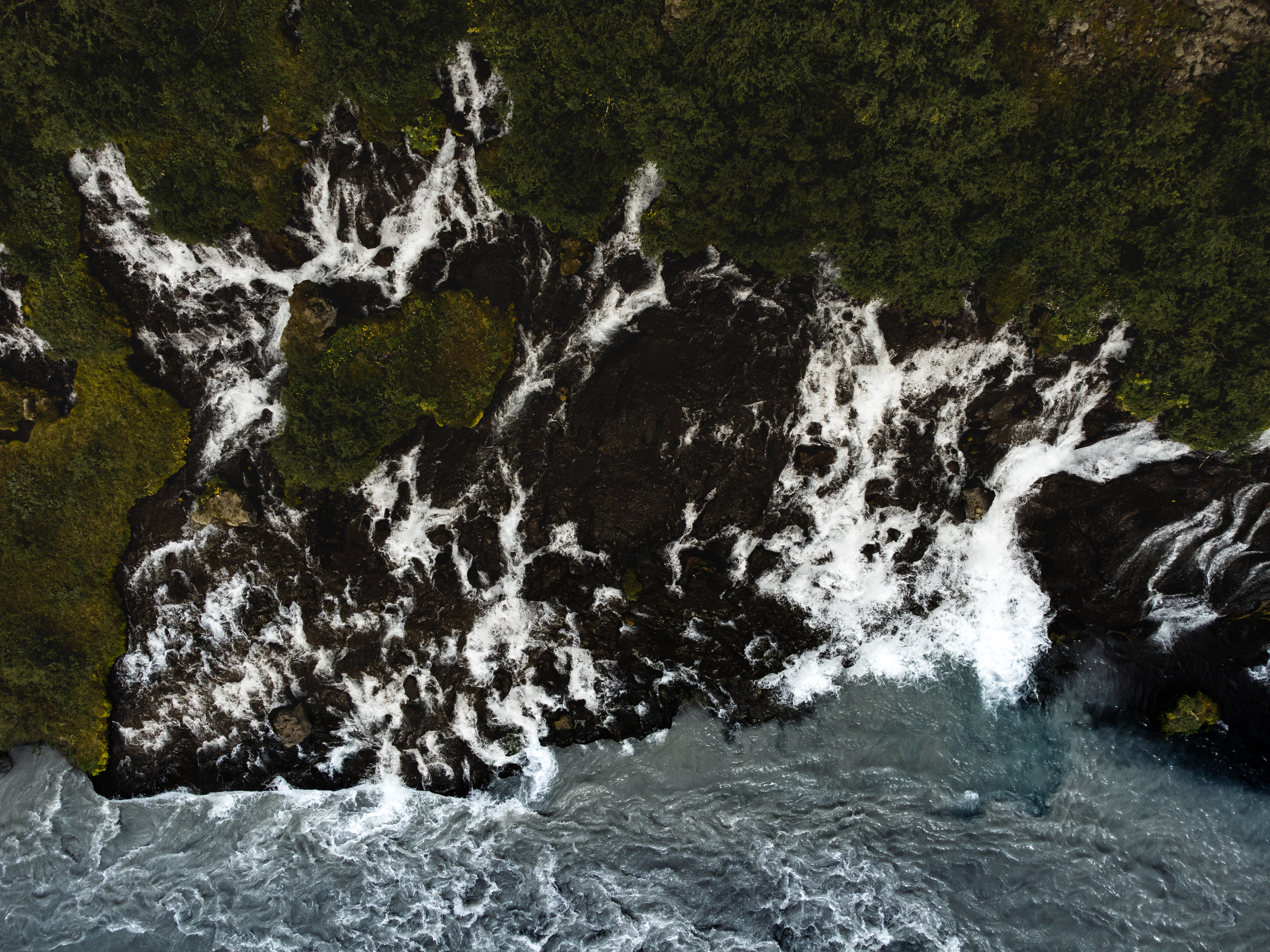
Hraunfossar, Iceland captured by a drone-camera

Aerial photography typically refers specifically to bird's-eye view images that focus on landscapes and surface objects, and should not be confused with air-to-air photography, where one or more aircraft are used as chase planes that "chase" and photograph other aircraft in flight. Elevated photography can also produce bird's-eye images closely resembling aerial photography (despite not actually being aerial shots) when telephotoing from high vantage structures, suspended on cables (e.g. Skycam) or on top of very tall poles that are either handheld (e.g. monopods and selfie sticks), fixed firmly to the ground (e.g. surveillance cameras and crane shots) or mounted above vehicles.

== History ==
=== Early ===
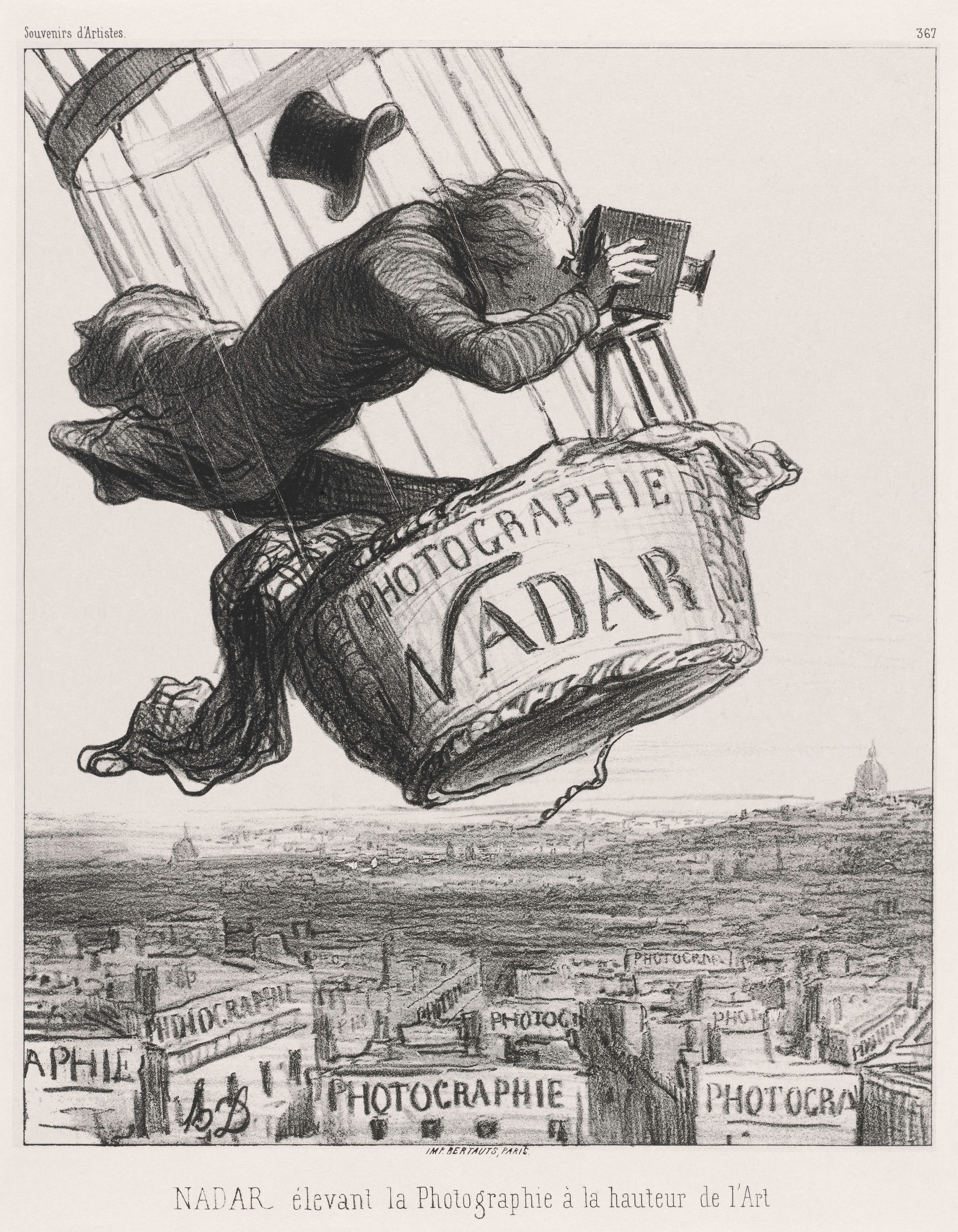
Honoré Daumier, "Nadar élevant la Photographie à la hauteur de l'Art" (Nadar elevating Photography to Art), published in Le Boulevard, May 25, 1862

Aerial photography was first practiced by the French photographer and balloonist Gaspard-Félix Tournachon, known as "Nadar", in 1858 over Paris, France. However, the photographs he produced no longer exist and therefore the earliest surviving aerial photograph is titled 'Boston, as the Eagle and the Wild Goose See It.' Taken by James Wallace Black and Samuel Archer King on October 13, 1860, it depicts Boston from a height of 630m.

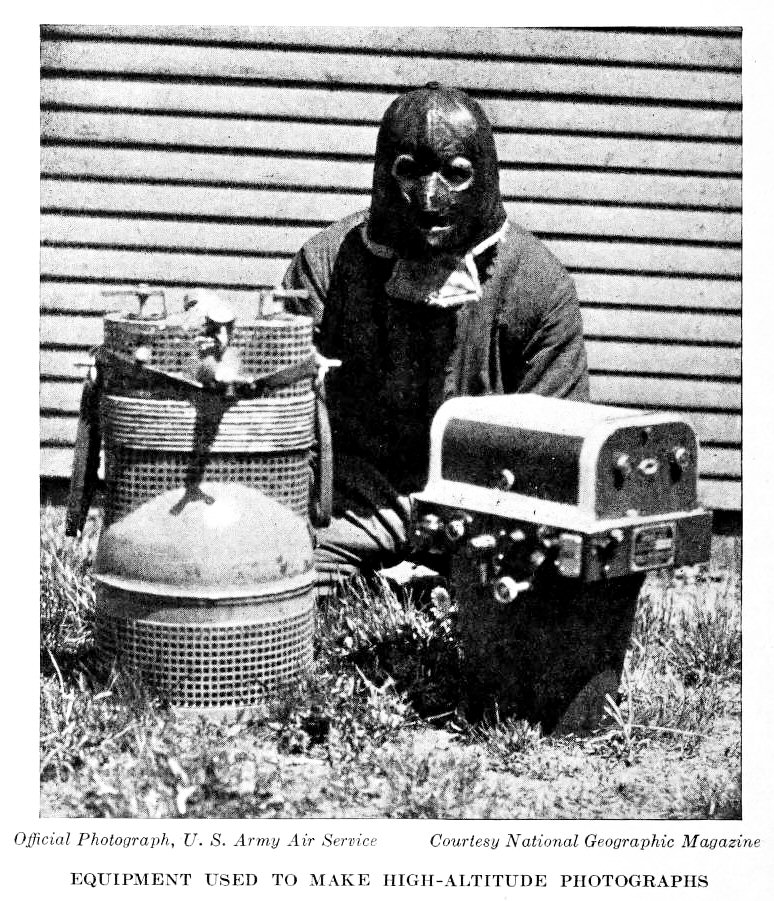
Equipment Used to Make High-Altitude Photographs (1924)

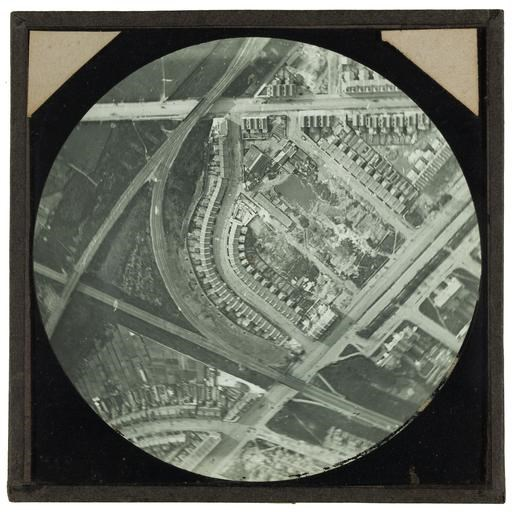
Aerial view by Cecil Shadbolt, showing Stonebridge Road, Stamford Hill, and Seven Sisters Curve, part of the Tottenham and Hampstead Junction Railway, taken from 2,000 feet (610 m) on 29 May 1882 – the earliest extant aerial photograph taken in the British Isles

Kite aerial photography was pioneered by British meteorologist E.D. Archibald in 1882. The same year, Cecil Shadbolt devised a method of taking photographs from the basket of a gas balloon. One of his images, taken from 2,000 feet (610 m) over Stamford Hill, is the earliest extant aerial photograph taken in the British Isles.

Frenchman Arthur Batut began using kites for photography in 1888, and wrote a book on his methods in 1890. Samuel Franklin Cody developed his advanced 'Man-lifter War Kite' and succeeded in interesting the British War Office with its capabilities.

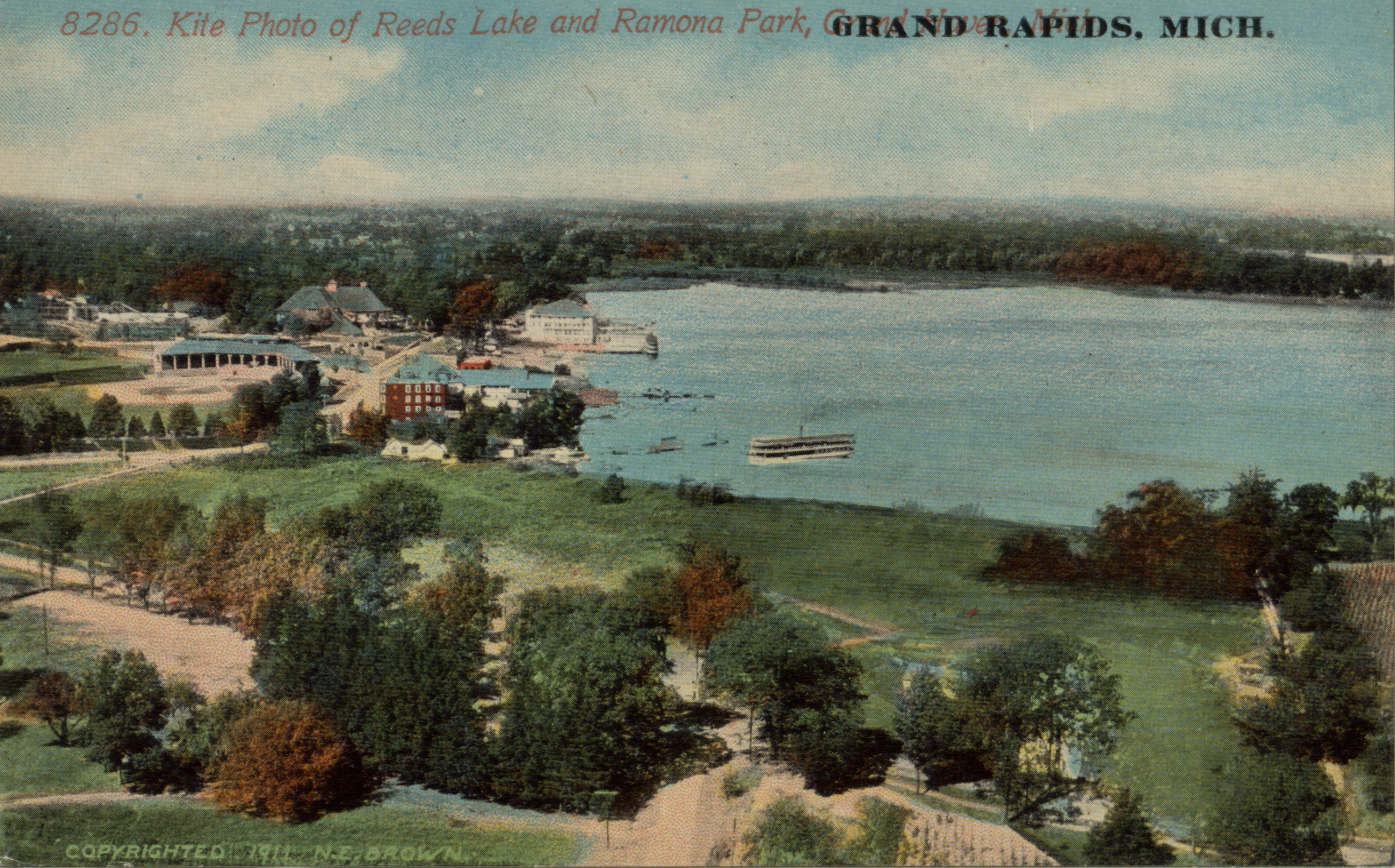
Antique postcard from Grand Rapids, Michigan, using kite photo technique (c. 1911)

In 1908, Albert Samama Chikly filmed the first ever aerial views using a balloon between Hammam-Lif and Grombalia. The first use of a motion picture camera mounted to a heavier-than-air aircraft took place on April 24, 1909, over Rome in the 3:28 silent film short, Wilbur Wright und seine Flugmaschine.

=== World War I ===
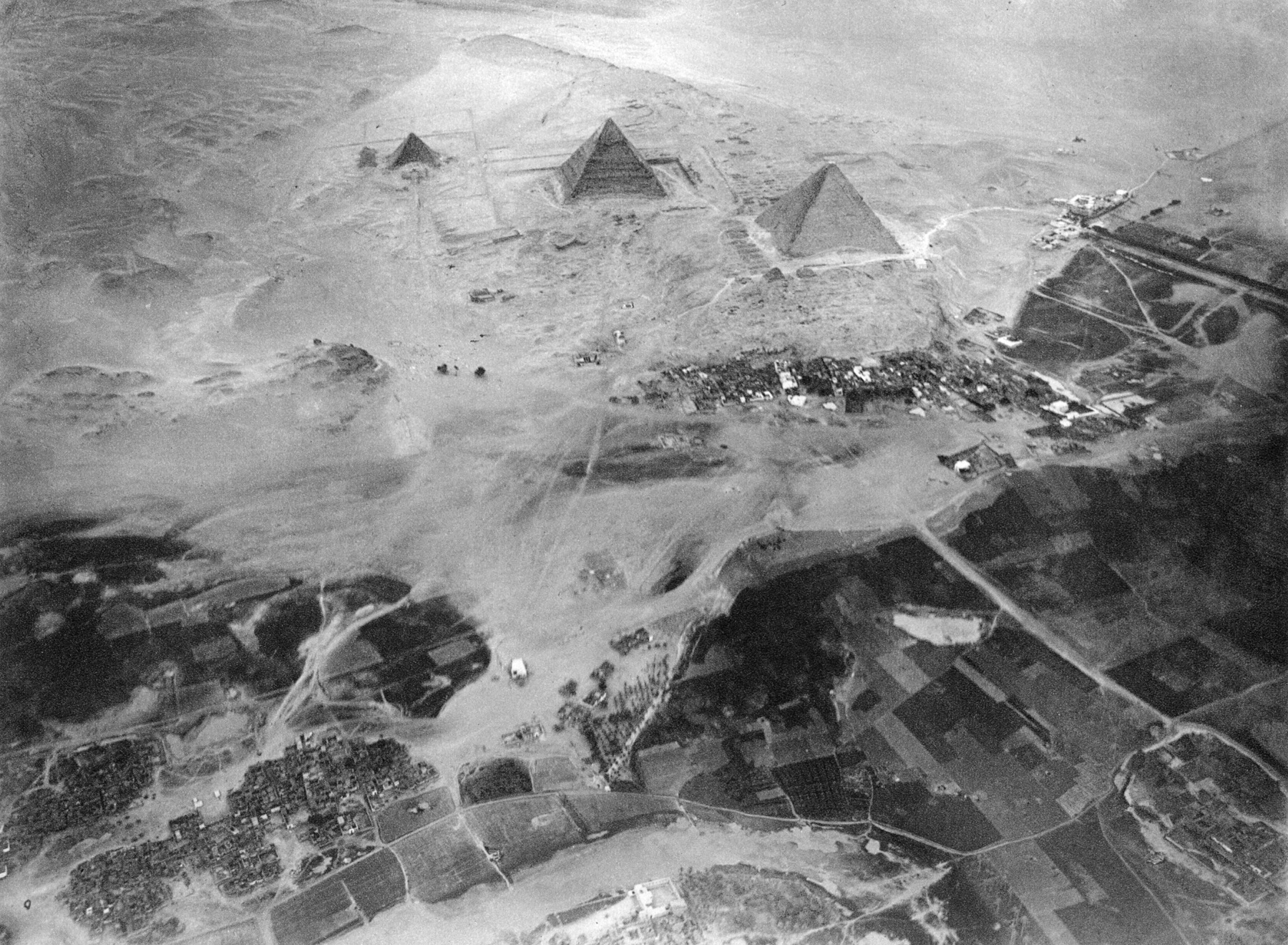
Giza pyramid complex, photographed from Eduard Spelterini's balloon on November 21, 1904

The use of aerial photography rapidly matured during the war, as reconnaissance aircraft were equipped with cameras to record enemy movements and defenses. At the start of the conflict, the usefulness of aerial photography was not fully appreciated, with reconnaissance being accomplished with map sketching from the air.

Germany adopted the first aerial camera, a Görz, in 1913. The French began the war with several squadrons of Blériot observation aircraft equipped with cameras for reconnaissance. The French Army developed procedures for getting prints into the hands of field commanders in record time.

Frederick Charles Victor Laws started aerial photography experiments in 1912 with No.1 Squadron of the Royal Flying Corps (later No. 1 Squadron RAF), taking photographs from the British dirigible Beta. He discovered that vertical photos taken with a 60% overlap could be used to create a stereoscopic effect when viewed in a stereoscope, thus creating a perception of depth that could aid in cartography and in intelligence derived from aerial images. The Royal Flying Corps recon pilots began to use cameras for recording their observations in 1914 and by the Battle of Neuve Chapelle in 1915, the entire system of German trenches was being photographed. In 1916, the Austro-Hungarian Monarchy made vertical camera axis aerial photos above Italy for map-making.

The first purpose-built and practical aerial camera was invented by Captain John Moore-Brabazon in 1915 with the help of the Thornton-Pickard company, greatly enhancing the efficiency of aerial photography. The camera was inserted into the floor of the aircraft and could be triggered by the pilot at intervals. Moore-Brabazon also pioneered the incorporation of stereoscopic techniques into aerial photography, allowing the height of objects on the landscape to be discerned by comparing photographs taken at different angles.

By the end of the war, aerial cameras had dramatically increased in size and focal power and were used increasingly frequently as they proved their pivotal military worth; by 1918, both sides were photographing the entire front twice a day and had taken over half a million photos since the beginning of the conflict. In January 1918, General Allenby used five Australian pilots from No. 1 Squadron AFC to photograph a 624 square miles (1,620 km^{2}) area in Palestine as an aid to correcting and improving maps of the Turkish front. This was a pioneering use of aerial photography as an aid for cartography. Lieutenants Leonard Taplin, Allan Runciman Brown, H. L. Fraser, Edward Patrick Kenny, and L. W. Rogers photographed a block of land stretching from the Turkish front lines 32 miles (51 km) deep into their rear areas. Beginning 5 January, they flew with a fighter escort to ward off enemy fighters. Using Royal Aircraft Factory BE.12 and Martinsyde airplanes, they not only overcame enemy air attacks, but also had to contend with 65 mph (105 km/h) winds, antiaircraft fire, and malfunctioning equipment to complete their task.

=== Commercial ===
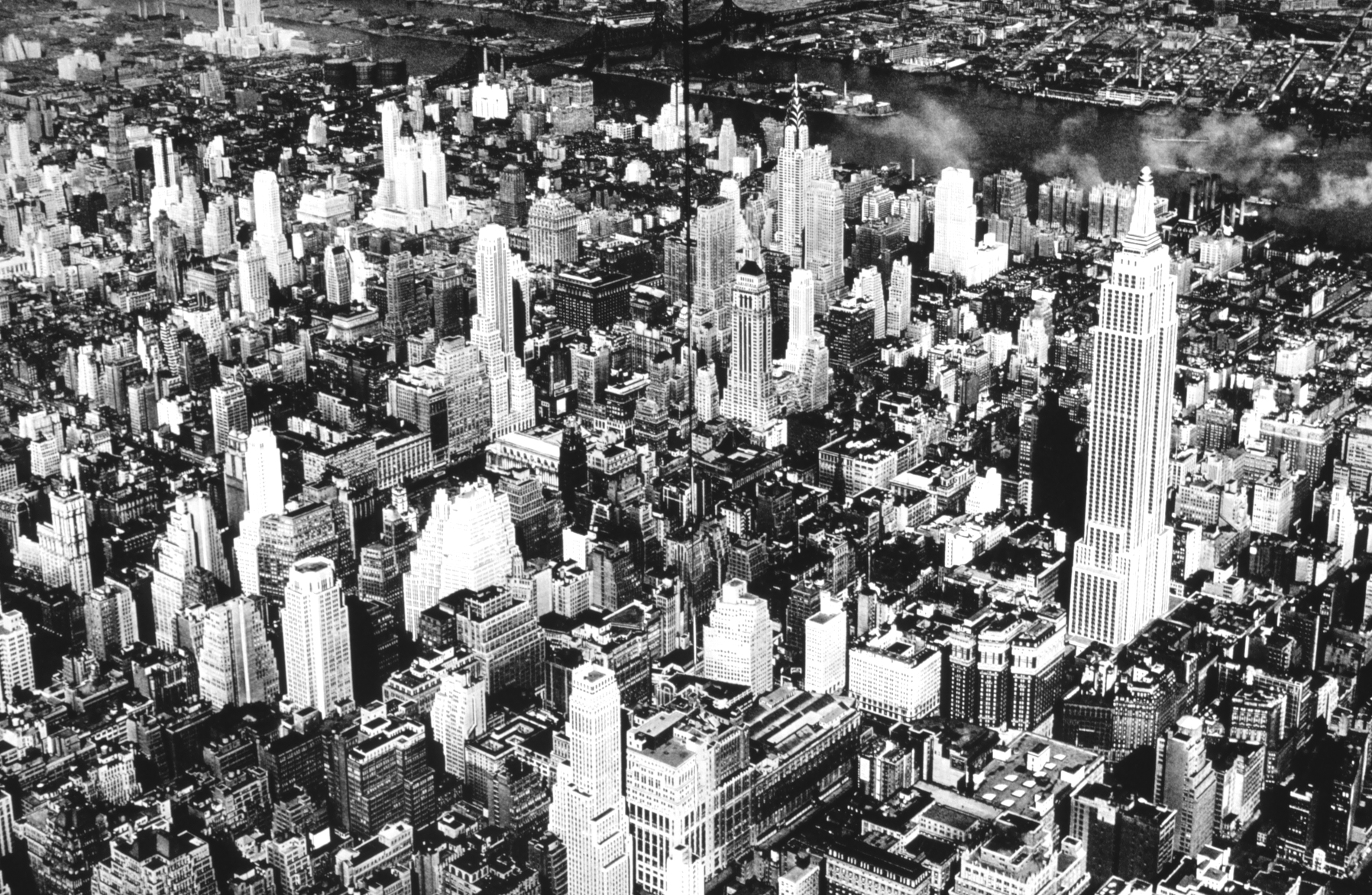
New York City in 1932, aerial photograph of Fairchild Aerial Surveys Inc

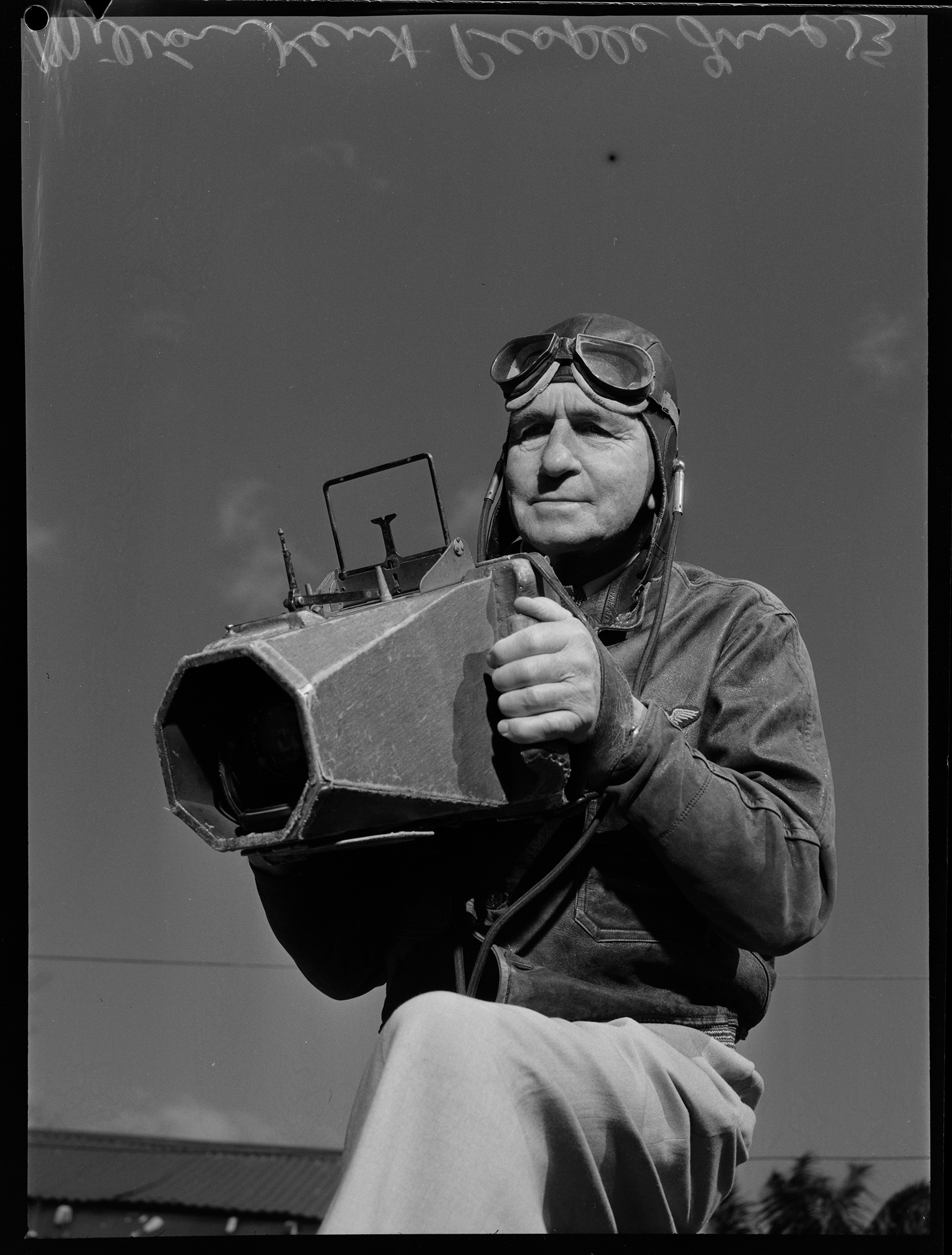
Milton Kent with his aerial camera, June 1953, Milton Kent Studio, Sydney

The first commercial aerial photography company in the UK was Aerofilms Ltd, founded by World War I veterans Francis Wills and Claude Graham White in 1919. The company soon expanded into a business with major contracts in Africa and Asia as well as in the UK. Operations began from the Stag Lane Aerodrome at Edgware, using the aircraft of the London Flying School. Subsequently, the Aircraft Manufacturing Company (later the De Havilland Aircraft Company), hired an Airco DH.9 along with pilot entrepreneur Alan Cobham.

From 1921, Aerofilms carried out vertical photography for survey and mapping purposes. During the 1930s, the company pioneered the science of photogrammetry (mapping from aerial photographs), with the Ordnance Survey amongst the company's clients. In 1920, the Australian Milton Kent started using a half-plate oblique aero camera purchased from Carl Zeiss AG in his aerial photographic business.

Another successful pioneer of the commercial use of aerial photography was the American Sherman Fairchild who started with his own aircraft firm Fairchild Aircraft to develop and build specialized aircraft for high altitude aerial survey missions. One Fairchild aerial survey aircraft in 1935 carried a unit that combined two synchronized cameras. Utilizing two units of ten lenses each with a ten-inch lens, the aircraft took photos from 23,000 feet. Each photo covered two hundred and twenty-five square miles. One of its first government contracts was an aerial survey of New Mexico to study soil erosion. A year later, Fairchild introduced a better high altitude camera with a nine-lens in one unit that could take a photo covering 600 square miles with each exposure from 30,000 feet.

=== World War II ===
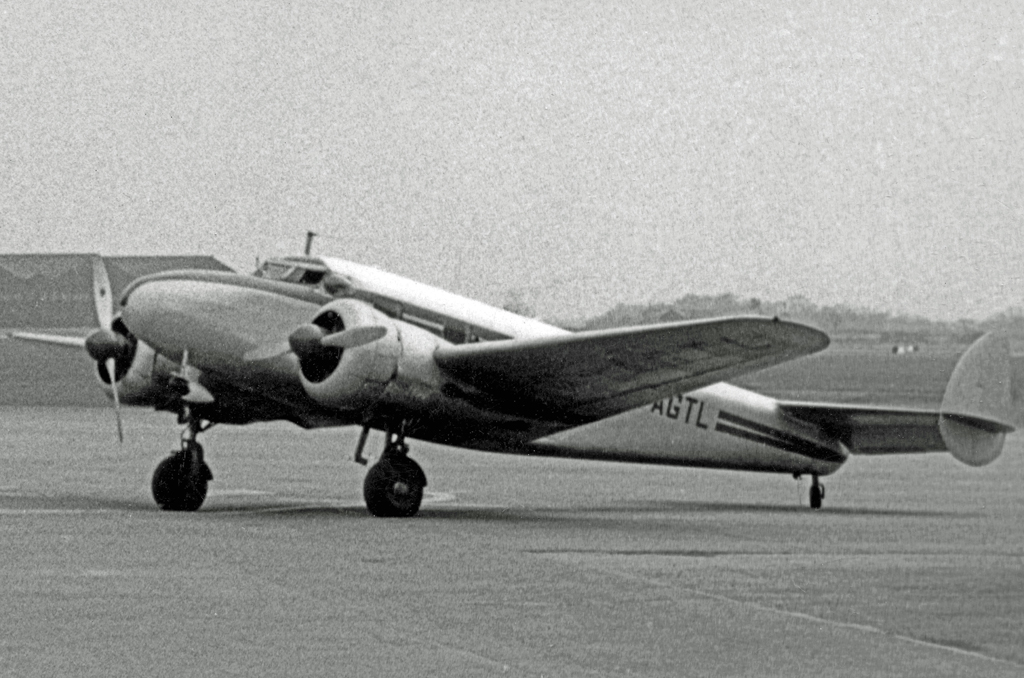
Sidney Cotton's Lockheed 12A, in which he made a high-speed reconnaissance flight in 1940

In 1939, Sidney Cotton and Flying Officer Maurice Longbottom of the RAF were among the first to suggest that airborne reconnaissance may be a task better suited to fast, small aircraft which would use their speed and high service ceiling to avoid detection and interception. Although this seems obvious now, with modern reconnaissance tasks performed by fast, high flying aircraft, at the time it was radical thinking.

They proposed the use of Spitfires with their armament and radios removed and replaced with extra fuel and cameras. This led to the development of the Spitfire PR variants. Spitfires proved to be extremely successful in their reconnaissance role and there were many variants built specifically for that purpose. They served initially with what later became No. 1 Photographic Reconnaissance Unit (PRU). In 1928, the RAF developed an electric heating system for the aerial camera. This allowed reconnaissance aircraft to take pictures from very high altitudes without the camera parts freezing. Based at RAF Medmenham, the collection and interpretation of such photographs became a considerable enterprise.

Cotton's aerial photographs were far ahead of their time. Together with other members of the 1 PRU, he pioneered the techniques of high-altitude, high-speed stereoscopic photography that were instrumental in revealing the locations of many crucial military and intelligence targets. According to R.V. Jones, photographs were used to establish the size and the characteristic launching mechanisms for both the V-1 flying bomb and the V-2 rocket. Cotton also worked on ideas such as a prototype specialist reconnaissance aircraft and further refinements of photographic equipment. At the peak, the British flew over 100 reconnaissance flights a day, yielding 50,000 images per day to interpret. Similar efforts were taken by other countries.

While stationed on an aircraft carrier in Imperial Japan, FS Hussain, a pilot in the Royal Indian Air Force, was tasked with photographing the aftermath of the Atomic bombings of Hiroshima and Nagasaki. Unaware of the risks of exposure to radiation, it led to his death in 1969 at the age of 44.

== Uses ==
Vertical aerial photography is used in cartography (particularly in photogrammetric surveys, which are often the basis for topographic maps), land-use planning, aerial archaeology. Oblique aerial photography is used for movie production, environmental studies, power line inspection, surveillance, construction progress, commercial advertising, conveyancing, and artistic projects. An example of how aerial photography is used in the field of archaeology is the mapping project done at the site Angkor Borei in Cambodia from 1995 to 1996. Using aerial photography, archaeologists were able to identify archaeological features, including 112 water features (reservoirs, artificially constructed pools and natural ponds) within the walled site of Angkor Borei. In the United States, aerial photographs are used in many Phase I Environmental Site Assessments for property analysis.

== Aircraft ==
In the United States, except when necessary for take-off and landing, full-sized manned aircraft are prohibited from flying at altitudes under 1000 feet over congested areas and not closer than 500 feet from any person, vessel, vehicle or structure over non-congested areas. Certain exceptions are allowed for helicopters, powered parachutes and weight-shift-control aircraft.

=== Radio-controlled ===
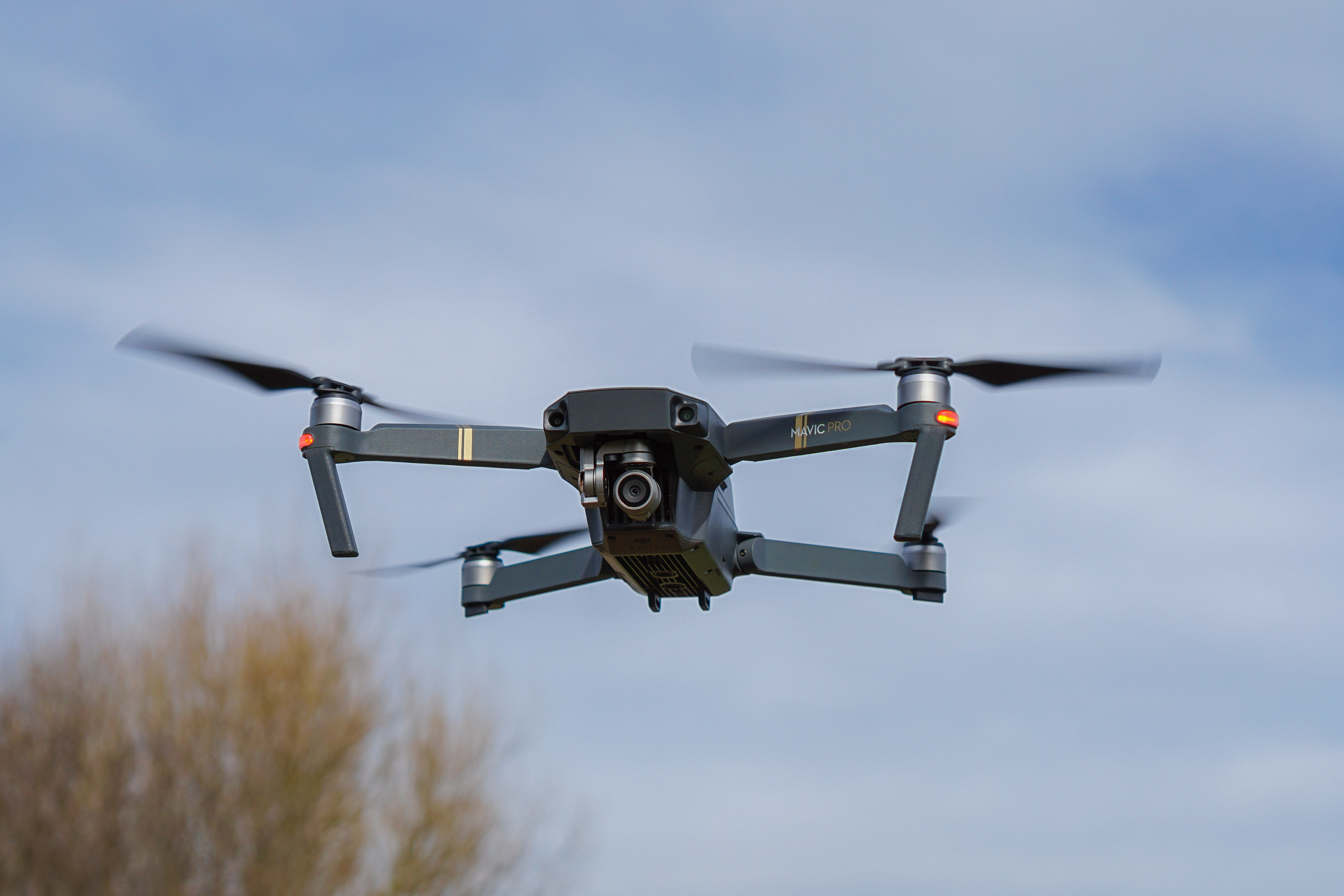
Advancements in drone technology have allowed aerial photographs to be taken by quadcopter drones, such as this DJI Mavic Pro.

Advances in radio controlled models have made it possible for model aircraft to conduct low-altitude aerial photography. This had benefited real-estate advertising, where commercial and residential properties are the photographic subject. In 2014, the US Federal Aviation Administration banned the use of drones for photographs in real estate advertisements. The ban has been lifted and commercial aerial photography using drones of UAS is regulated under the FAA Reauthorization Act of 2018. Commercial pilots have to complete the requirements for a Part 107 license, while amateur and non-commercial use is restricted by the FAA.

Small scale model aircraft offer increased photographic access to these previously restricted areas. Miniature vehicles do not replace full-size aircraft, as full-size aircraft are capable of longer flight times, higher altitudes, and greater equipment payloads. They are, however, useful in any situation in which a full-scale aircraft would be dangerous to operate. Examples would include the inspection of transformers atop power transmission lines and slow, low-level flight over agricultural fields, both of which can be accomplished by a large-scale radio-controlled helicopter. Professional-grade, gyroscopically stabilized camera platforms are available for use under such a model; a large model helicopter with a 26cc gasoline engine can hoist a payload of approximately seven kilograms (15 pounds). One example is the radio controlled Nitrohawk helicopter developed by Robert Channon between 1988 and 1998. In addition to gyroscopically stabilized footage, the use of RC copters as reliable aerial photography tools increased with the integration of FPV (first-person-view) technology. Many radio-controlled aircraft, in particular drones, are now capable of utilizing Wi-Fi to stream live video from the aircraft's camera back to the pilot's or pilot in command's (PIC) ground station.

== Regulations ==
=== Australia ===
In Australia, Civil Aviation Safety Regulation Part 101 (CASR Part 101) allows for commercial use of unmanned and remotely piloted aircraft. Under these regulations, unmanned remotely piloted aircraft for commercial are referred to as Remotely Piloted Aircraft Systems (RPAS), whereas radio-controlled aircraft for recreational purposes are referred to as model aircraft. Under CASR Part 101, businesses/persons operating remotely piloted aircraft commercially are required to hold an operator certificate, just like manned aircraft operators. Pilots of remotely piloted aircraft operating commercially are also required to be licensed by the Civil Aviation Safety Authority (CASA). While a small RPAS and model aircraft may actually be identical, unlike model aircraft, a RPAS may enter controlled airspace with approval, and operate close to an aerodrome.

Due to a number of illegal operators in Australia, making false claims of being approved, CASA maintains and publishes a list of approved remote operator's certificate (ReOC) holders. However, CASA has modified the regulations and from September 29, 2016, drones under 2 kg (4.4 lb) may be operated for commercial purposes.

=== United States ===
2006 FAA regulations grounding all commercial RC model flights have been upgraded to require formal FAA certification before permission is granted to fly at any altitude in the US.

On June 25, 2014, the FAA, in ruling 14 CFR Part 91 [Docket No. FAA–2014–0396] "Interpretation of the Special Rule for Model Aircraft", banned the commercial use of unmanned aircraft over U.S. airspace. On September 26, 2014, the FAA began granting the right to use drones in aerial filmmaking. Operators are required to be licensed pilots and must keep the drone in view at all times. Drones cannot be used to film in areas where people might be put at risk.

The FAA Modernization and Reform Act of 2012 established, in Section 336, a special rule for model aircraft. In Section 336, Congress confirmed the FAA's long-standing position that model aircraft are aircraft. Under the terms of the Act, a model aircraft is defined as "an unmanned aircraft" that is "(1) capable of sustained flight in the atmosphere; (2) flown within visual line of sight of the person operating the aircraft; and (3) flown for hobby or recreational purposes."

Because anything capable of being viewed from a public space is considered outside the realm of privacy in the United States, aerial photography may legally document features and occurrences on private property.

The FAA can pursue enforcement action against persons operating model aircraft who endanger the safety of the national airspace system: Public Law 112–95, section 336(b).

On June 21, 2016, the FAA released its summary of small unmanned aircraft rules (Part 107). The rules established guidelines for small UAS operators including operating only during the daytime, a 400 ft (120 m). ceiling and pilots must keep the UAS in visual range.

On April 7, 2017, the FAA announced special security instructions under 14 CFR § 99.7. Effective April 14, 2017, all UAS flights within 400 feet of the lateral boundaries of U.S. military installations are prohibited unless a special permit is secured from the base and/or the FAA.

=== United Kingdom ===
Aerial photography in the UK has tight regulations as to where a drone is able to fly.

Aerial Photography on Light aircraft under 20 kg (44 lb). Basic Rules for non commercial flying Of a SUA (Small Unmanned Aircraft).

Article 241 Endangering safety of any person or property states that a person must not recklessly or negligently cause or permit an aircraft to endanger any person or property.

Article 94 mentions the following about small unmanned aircraft:

1. A person must not cause or permit any article or animal (whether or not attached to a parachute) to be dropped from a small unmanned aircraft so as to endanger persons or property.
2. The person in charge of a small unmanned aircraft may only fly the aircraft if reasonably satisfied that the flight can safely be made.
3. The person in charge of a small unmanned aircraft must maintain direct, unaided visual contact with the aircraft sufficient to monitor its flight path in relation to other aircraft, persons, vehicles, vessels and structures for the purpose of avoiding collisions. (500 m (1,600 ft))
4. The person in charge of a small unmanned aircraft which has a mass of more than 7 kg (15 lb) excluding its fuel but including any articles or equipment installed in or attached to the aircraft at the commencement of its flight, must not fly the aircraft:
  1. In Class A, C, D or E airspace unless the permission of the appropriate air traffic control unit has been obtained;
  2. Within an aerodrome traffic zone during the notified hours of watch of the air traffic control unit (if any) at that aerodrome unless the permission of any such air traffic control unit has been obtained;
  3. At a height of more than 400 feet above the surface
5. The person in charge of a small unmanned aircraft must not fly the aircraft for the purposes of commercial operations except in accordance with a permission granted by the CAA.

Article 95 has the following to say about small unmanned surveillance aircraft:

1. You Must not fly your aircraft over or within 150 metres of any congested Area.
2. Over or within 150 m (490 ft) of an organised open-air assembly of more than 1,000 persons.
3. Within 50 m (160 ft) of any vessel, vehicle or structure which is not under the control of the person in charge of the aircraft.
4. Within 50 m of any person, during take-off or landing, a small unmanned surveillance aircraft must not be flown within 30 m (98 ft) of any person. This does not apply to the person in charge of the small unmanned surveillance aircraft or a person under the control of the person in charge of the aircraft.

Model aircraft with a mass of more than 20 kg are termed 'Large Model Aircraft' – within the UK, large model aircraft may only be flown in accordance with an exemption from the ANO, which must be issued by the CAA.

== Types ==
=== Oblique ===
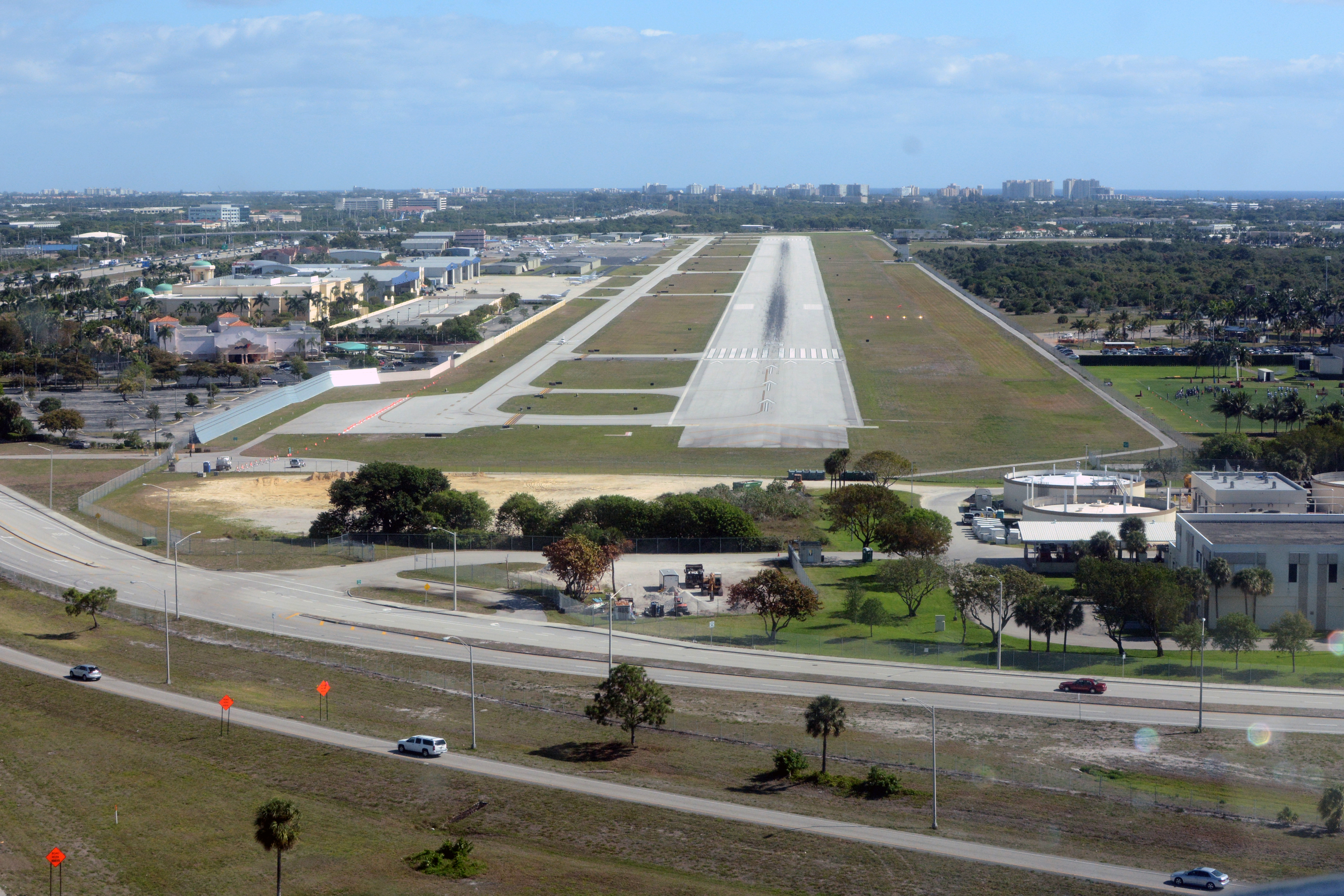
Oblique Aerial Photo

Photographs taken at an angle are called oblique photographs. If they are taken from a low angle relative to the earth's surface, they are called low oblique and photographs taken from a high angle are called high or steep oblique.

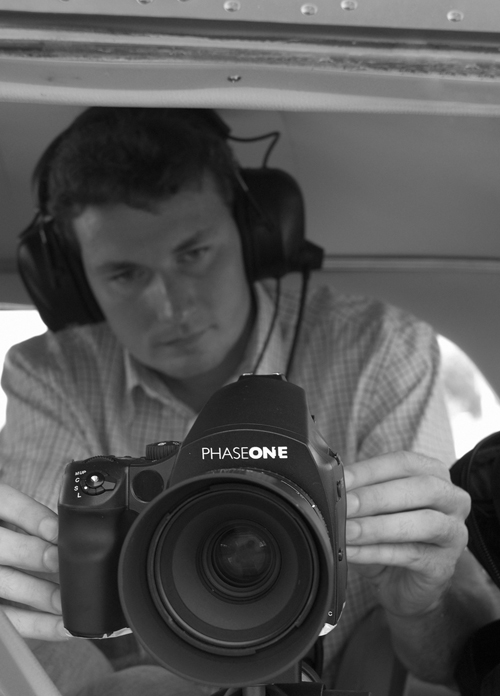
An aerial photographer prepares continuous oblique shooting in a Cessna 206

=== Vertical (Nadir) ===
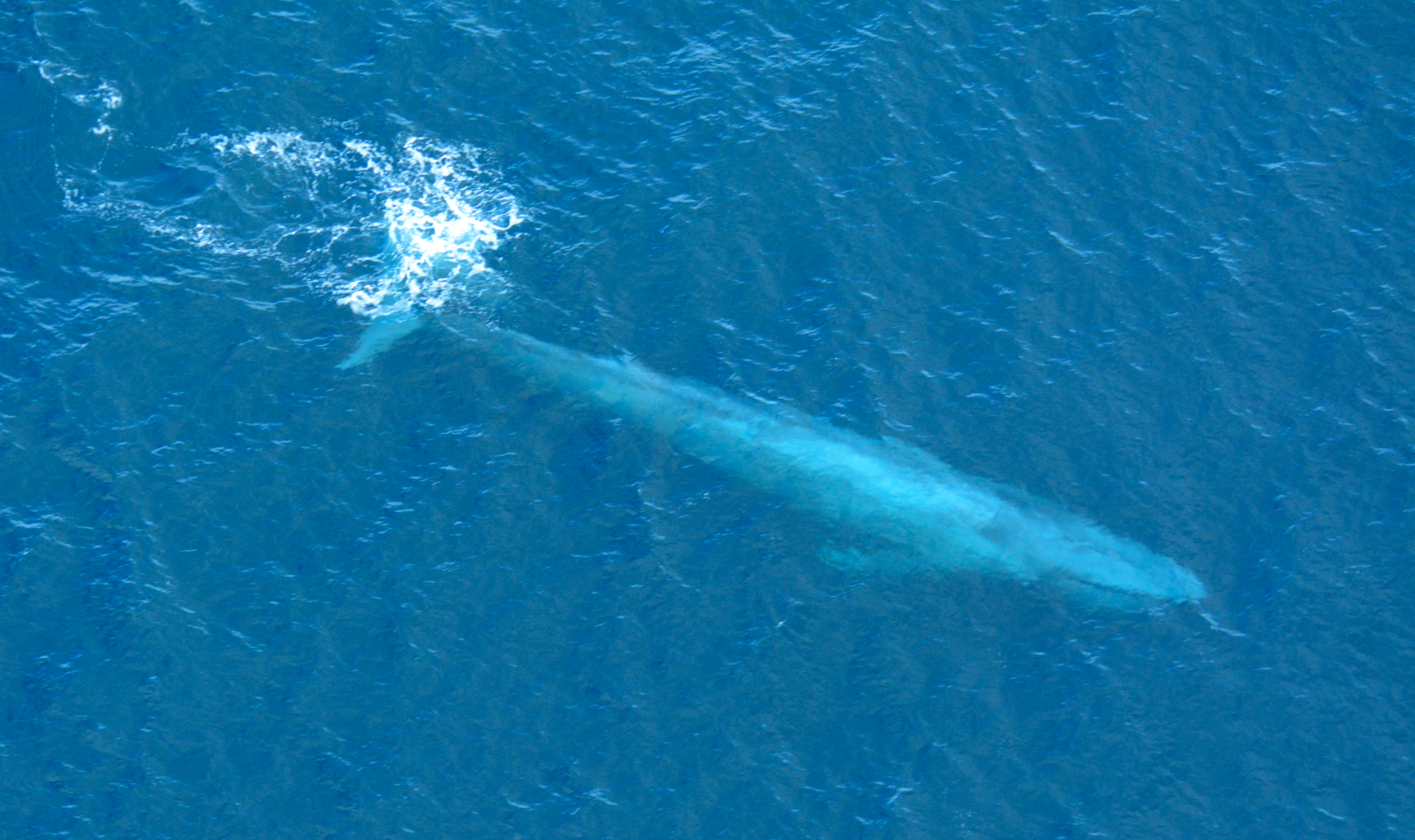
Vertical Orientation Aerial Photo

Vertical photographs are taken straight down. They are mainly used in photogrammetry and image interpretation. Pictures that will be used in photogrammetry are traditionally taken with special large format cameras with calibrated and documented geometric properties.

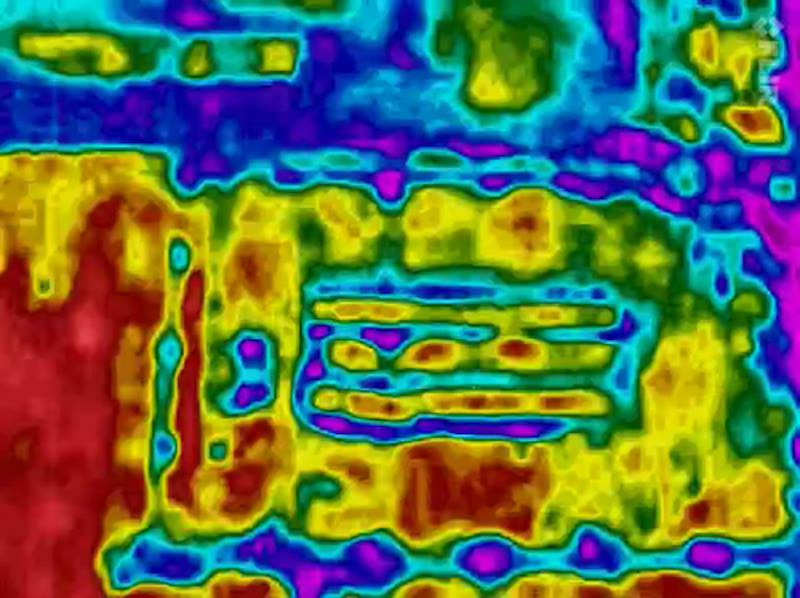
A vertical still from a kite aerial thermal video of part of a former brickworks site captured at night. http://www.armadale.org.uk/aerialthermography.htm

=== Combined ===
Aerial photographs are often combined. Depending on their purpose, it can be done in several ways, of which a few are listed below.

- Panoramas can be made by stitching several photographs taken in different angles from one spot (e.g. with a hand held camera) or from different spots at the same angle (e.g. from a plane).
- Stereo photography techniques allow for the creation of 3D-images from several photographs of the same area taken from different spots.
- In pictometry, five rigidly mounted cameras provide one vertical and four low oblique pictures that can be used together.
- In some digital cameras, for aerial photogrammetry images from several imaging elements, sometimes with separate lenses, are geometrically corrected and combined to one image in the camera.

=== Orthophotomap ===
Vertical photographs are often used to create orthophotos, alternatively known as orthophotomaps, photographs which have been geometrically "corrected" so as to be usable as a map. In other words, an orthophoto is a simulation of a photograph taken from an infinite distance, looking straight down to nadir. Perspective must obviously be removed, but variations in terrain should also be corrected for. Multiple geometric transformations are applied to the image, depending on the perspective and terrain corrections required on a particular part of the image.

Orthophotos are commonly used in geographic information systems, such as are used by mapping agencies (e.g. Ordnance Survey) to create maps. Once the images have been aligned, or "registered", with known real-world coordinates, they can be widely deployed.

Large sets of orthophotos, typically derived from multiple sources and divided into "tiles" (each typically 256 x 256 pixels in size), are widely used in online map systems such as Google Maps. OpenStreetMap offers the use of similar orthophotos for deriving new map data. Google Earth overlays orthophotos or satellite imagery onto a digital elevation model to simulate 3D landscapes.

=== Leaf-off or leaf-on ===
Aerial photography may be labeled as either "leaf-off" or on "leaf-on" to indicate whether deciduous foliage is in the photograph. Leaf-off photographs show less foliage or no foliage at all, and are used to see the ground and things on the ground more closely. Leaf-on photographs are used to measure crop health and yield. For forestry purposes, some species of trees are easier to distinguish from other kinds of trees with leaf-off photography, while other species are easier to distinguish with leaf-on photography.

== Video ==
The Cliffs of Moher, filmed with a drone (2014)

With advancements in video technology, aerial video is becoming more popular. Orthogonal video is shot from aircraft mapping pipelines, crop fields, and other points of interest. Using GPS, video may be embedded with meta data and later synced with a video mapping program.

This "Spatial Multimedia" is the timely union of digital media including still photography, motion video, stereo, panoramic imagery sets, immersive media constructs, audio, and other data with location and date-time information from the GPS and other location designs.

Aerial videos are emerging Spatial Multimedia which can be used for scene understanding and object tracking. The input video is captured by low flying aerial platforms and typically consists of strong parallax from non-ground-plane structures. The integration of digital video, global positioning systems (GPS) and automated image processing will improve the accuracy and cost-effectiveness of data collection and reduction. Several different aerial platforms are under investigation for the data collection.

In film production, it is common to use a unmanned aerial vehicle with a mounted cine camera. For example, the AERIGON cinema drone is used for low aerial shots in big blockbuster movies.

== See also ==
Concepts and methods

- Aerial landscape art
- Aviation photography
- Geoinformatics
- Remote sensing
- Scheimpflug principle

Equipment and technology

- Airborne Real-time Cueing Hyperspectral Enhanced Reconnaissance
- Astrocam
- Fairchild K-20, WWII-era aerial camera
- Lidar
- Oracle, model photographic rocket
- TopoFlight
- VisionMap A3 Digital Mapping System

Individuals, organizations, and history

- Aerial image library
- First images of Earth from space
- Harvey Lloyd
- Houston–Mount Everest flight expedition
- National Collection of Aerial Photography
- Wikipedia category for articles on aerial photographers
