= Astrocam =

Model rocket with a built-in camera for taking aerial photographs

The Astrocam 110 (or Astrocam) is a model rocket with a built-in camera for taking aerial photographs.

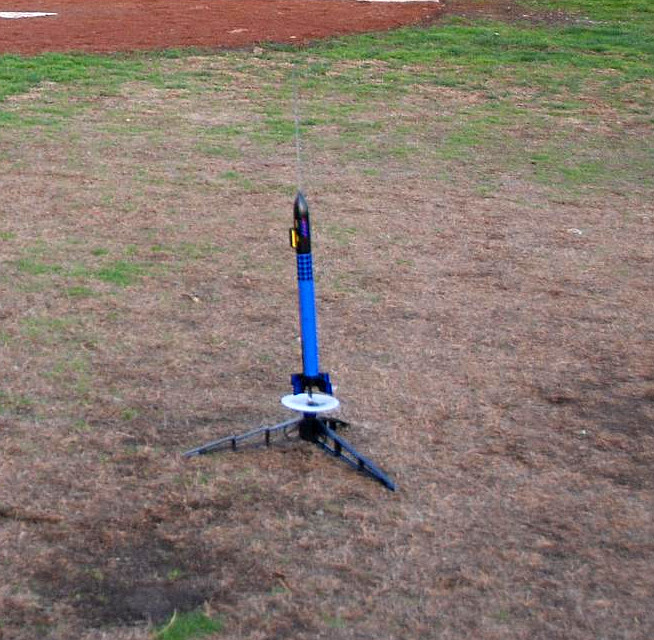
An Astrocam ready to launch

The Astrocam was introduced in the 1979 Catalog by its manufacturer Estes and it can be flown with B6-4 and C6-7 model rocket motors (see Model rocket motor classification). The Astrocam was available as kit, or as ready-to-fly model. Both versions use the Estes Delta II launch body. The camera uses 110 film and is mounted in the nose cone of the rocket with the aperture perpendicular to the main axis of the rocket. A mirror held in a hood is used like a periscope to enable the camera to look forward. The camera needs to be manually advanced and "cocked" by pulling a string attached to spring-loaded shutter taut. When the nose cone is placed on the rocket body, the string is placed between the nose cone and the body so that when the ejection charge of the engine expels the nose cone, the string is released causing one frame of film to be exposed. Since the rocket is not steerable, the photographer can not determine what the camera will photograph.

Stock models of the Astrocam were intended to take their photographs after the rocket had begun to descend after reaching apogee. However, in the Winter 1993 issue of the Estes Educator News magazine, two sets of instructions (Lookdown Astrocam, and the Lookdown Astrocam MK11) were included describing how the camera could be converted to look back down the length of the rocket before reaching apogee, or upon a staging event. Estes catalogs showed some of the photographs from these modified rockets, but they never produced a version designed to look down, or capable of being switched at will.

A version of the Astrocam called the Astrocam 110 is also available, and the Estes Snapshot is very similar as well. A modern version of the Astrocam is the Oracle, which shoots video. A newer video version, called the Astrovision, is also available.
