= Oracle (rocket) =

Model rocket

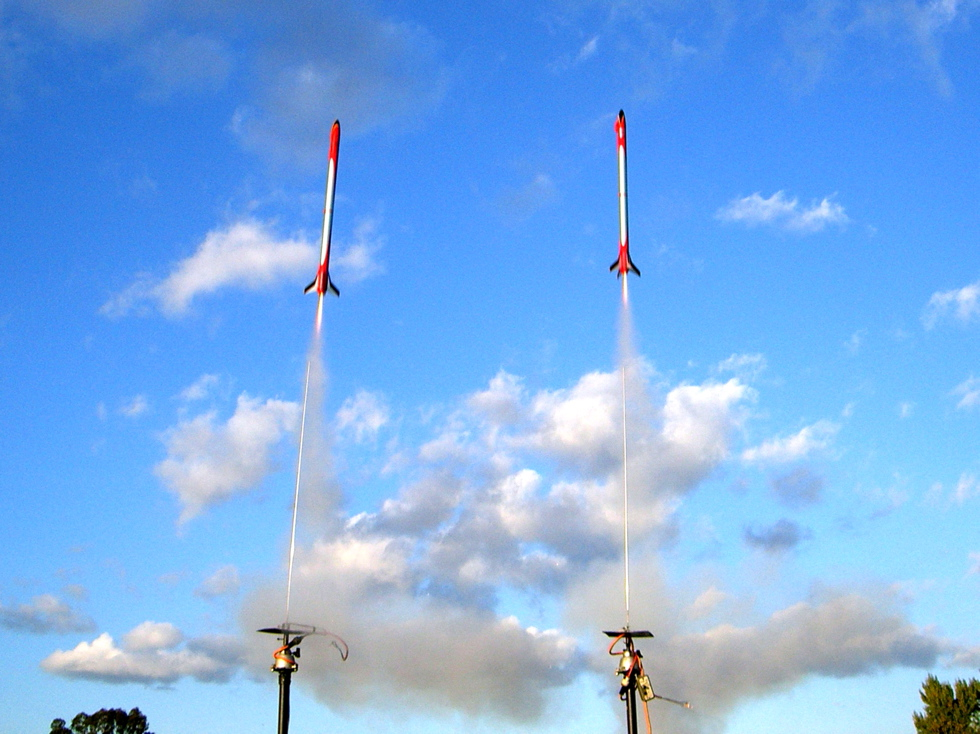
Twin Oracle model rocket launch.

Oracle is the name of a model rocket with a built-in digital camera, manufactured by Estes Industries, for aerial photography. In contrast to the camera rocket Astrocam, the Oracle allows the making of a complete film of a rocket flight. The Oracle is best flown with a D12 engine (see Estes number coding), but can be flown with C11 engines.

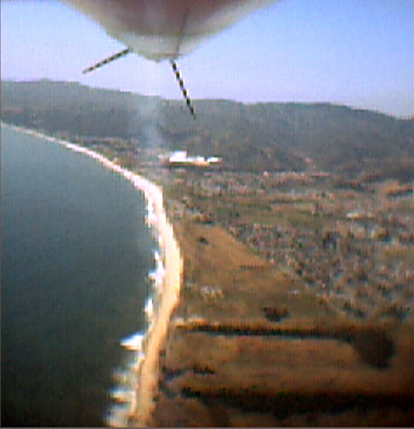
Oracle model rocket at apogee.

During launch, the camera films downward; showing the launch pad and engine exhaust during ascent. The rocket's nose cone may be attached to the parachute in two ways; there are attachments on both ends of the nose cone. Attaching the parachute to the bottom films the parachute during descent. Attaching the parachute to the top films the approach of the ground during descent.

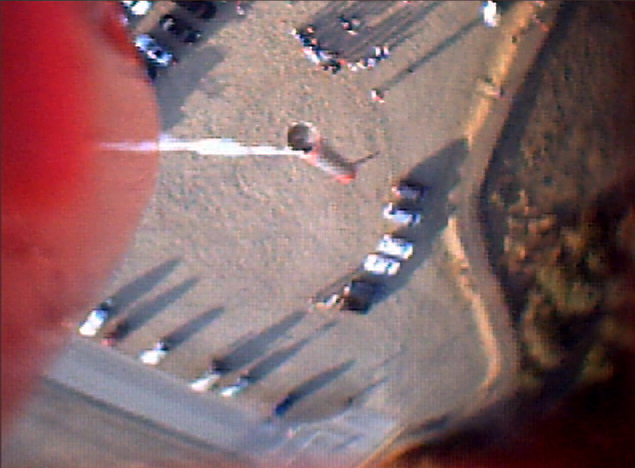
Oracle model rocket parachuting back to Earth.

The nose-cone attaches to a PC via USB. The resulting AVI file contains approximately 30 (between 30 and 35) seconds of uncompressed video at 9 frame/s at a resolution of 320 pixels wide by 240 pixels high (320×240). The data rate is 2047 kbit/s. The camera holds only one video at a time.
