= Aerial image library =

Collection of aerial imagery

An aerial image library is a collection of aerial imagery. The imagery is taken from cameras placed on aircraft, which capture images of the structures and features of the land below. These libraries can contain millions of individual images which depict geographic areas in incredible detail.

Aerial image libraries can provide a wealth of information to users of the imagery. Governments often use such libraries to maintain current records of construction and in conducting property assessment. Insurance companies can also use aerial image libraries to maintain records of natural disaster-related damages. Utilities companies may also keep libraries of electric corridors and pipeline networks to plan expansion or maintenance.

Using computer software, aerial image libraries can stitch together images to create lifelike maps of geographic regions. These maps can be either orthogonal (top-down images) or oblique (images captured at an angle). If these images are geo-referenced, users can determine precisely where the structures and features depicted are located on the earth.
