= Milton Kent =

Australian photographer

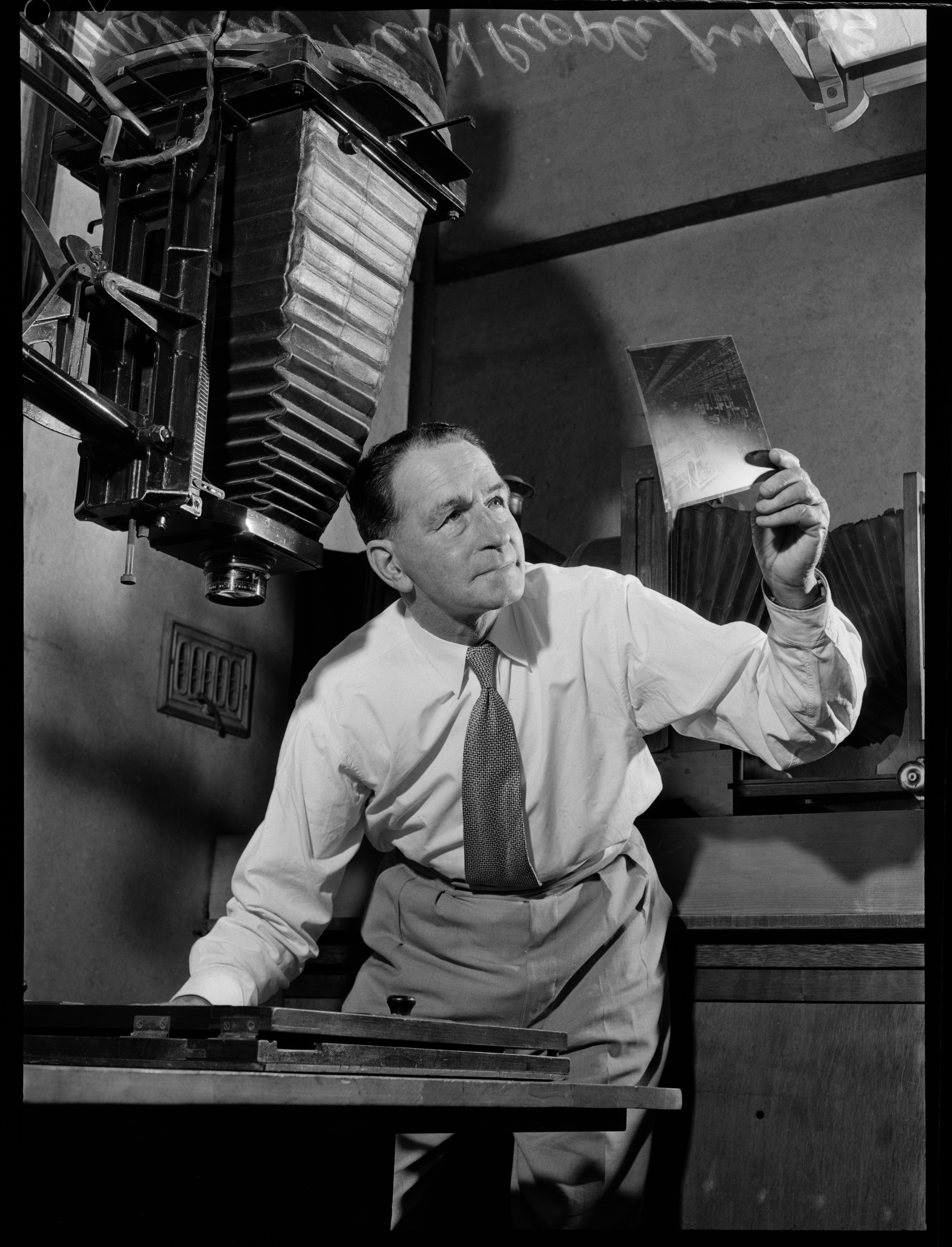
- Kent in his studio with enlarger (1953)
- Born: Milton Charles Lindsay Kent; 1888; Sydney, Australia
- Died: 13 April 1965 (aged 76–77); Sydney, Australia
- Education: Apprenticed to Charles Kent
- Known for: Aerial photography, industrial photography
- Spouse: Lillian Cropper (m. 1911)

Milton Kent (1888 – 13 April 1965) was a pioneer of industrial and aerial photography, a prize-winning airman and a champion sculler. Initially, Kent worked as a sports photographer but by the 1920s he had embraced aerial photography using a specially crafted oblique camera. Over the next 50 years, Kent used his camera to capture the opening of new blocks of land across Sydney, the construction of the harbour bridge and many other events up until his death in 1965.

== Early life ==
Milton's father, Charles Kent, was born in Collingwood, Victoria in 1862. Charles was a photographer who bought his photo business from Murrell & Co. and operated from a building at 314 George Street, Sydney. Milton was born above this studio in 1888 and from the age of ten was apprenticed to his father.

== Career ==
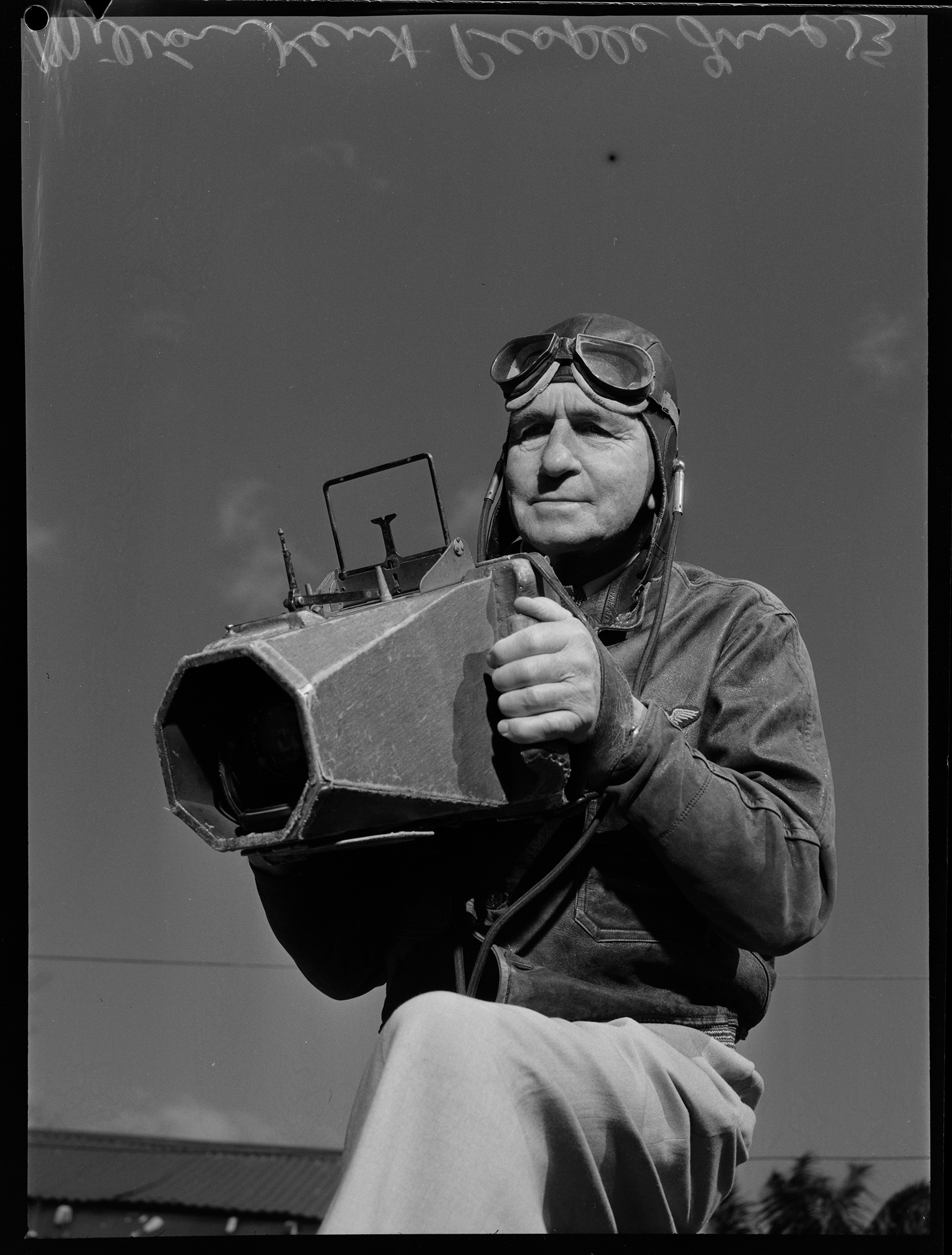
Milton Kent with his aerial camera, June 1953, Milton Kent Studio, Sydney

In 1909 Milton set up his own commercial business and his first contract was to photograph the fighter R. L. ‘Snowy’ Baker at the Rushcutters Bay Stadium. His Mentor camera could capture the action, but the old plate films and poor lighting inhibited indoor shots. Instead, he took his photos in the sunlit passages around the bleachers. Between 1914 and 1918 he photographed boxers in fighting poses, including Sid Francis; Jimmy Hill; Herb McCoy; Jeff Smith; and Les Darcy.

In Sydney, the motor industry was in its infancy and Milton found work with many of the early people working in the trade. These businessmen, in turn, recommended Milton their friends and along with the fact he delivered excellent results his business grew from strength to strength. In the years before the outbreak of World War One, he rode a motorcycle to jobs.

In 1911, he married Lillian Cropper, the daughter of an ex-mayor of Petersham but still found time to engage with the other love of his life, flying. As early as 1912 he made box-kites modelled on the designs by Lawrence Hargrave and he was later introduced to the aviator William Hart. Alert to the possibilities of aerial photography Kent took some images during one of Hart's flights using rapid panchromatic glass plates. In 1916, he was appointed official photographer to the State Government Aviation School at Richmond Sydney and became firm friends with the chief instructor, Captain W. J. Strutt. While not officially allowed to fly planes Kent learnt ‘under the lap’ while on photographic patrols around Sydney but was not allowed to land or take off.

It was during this time that Kent learnt about oblique aerial photography at altitudes from 500 to 5000 feet. The greatest problem was the lack of sensitivity of the plates which meant operating on full aperture at around 1/200 of a second and images could only be taken in full sunlight with no cloud.

This phase of his aerial activities ended when Strutt disappeared in a flight over the Bass Strait. But Kent was convinced there was a market in aerial photography and over this period, he hired aircraft from Nigel Love, to do photographic work.

In 1918 Love had purchased land at Mascot and formed Australian Aircraft & Engineering. He erected a canvas hangar on the site which went on to become Sydney Airport. 1918 also saw Charles Kent handed over his business to his son before he moved to Queensland.

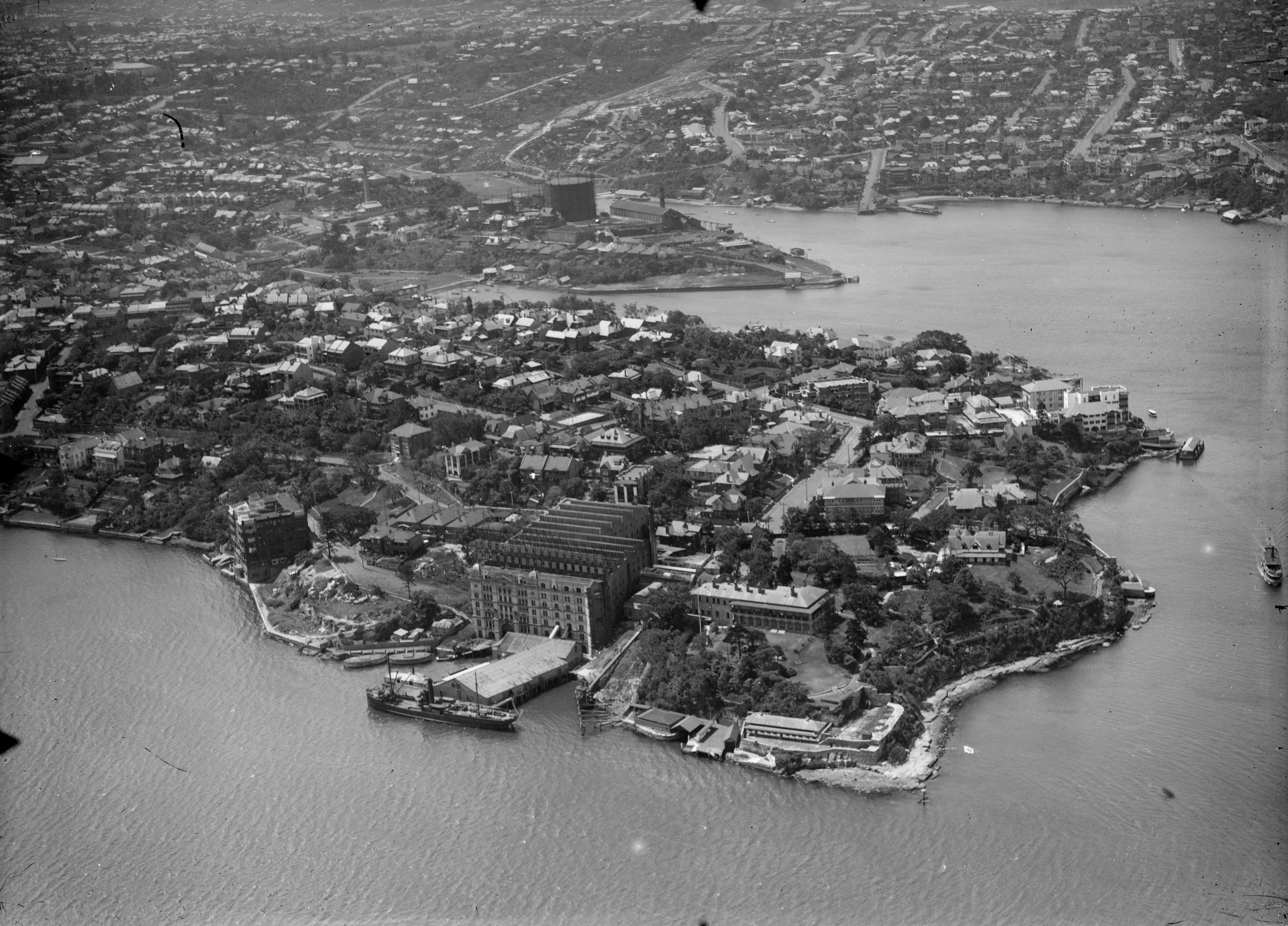
Pastoral Finance Association building, Kirribilli, North Sydney, circa 1921, Milton Kent

In 1920, Kent imported a half-plate oblique aero camera from Carl Zeiss AG in Germany for factory projects and real estate subdivisions. In 1921 aerial views of Kirribilli and Circular Quay by Kent appeared in the Sydney Morning Herald and three years later they published one of the more gruesome events which Kent covered. This was the aerial view of the area around Long Bay Correctional Centre where the body of a woman was found in May 1924.

In 1920 his son Lindsey was born, and he won the Mile Sculling Championship of New South Wales. It was also the year the New South Wales Aero Club was formed, and Milton was one of the first pupils after joining the club around 1924. He was awarded his licence in November 1926.

In 1927, he bought a Westland Widgeon two-seater monoplane with silver wings and a blue two-toned fuselage. Kent felt the single wing gave a clearer view for his photographic work. On 12 November 1927, he used the plane to win the speed championship at the Aerial Derby in Queensland. The following year he tried to break the plane speed record from Sydney to Brisbane. Unfortunately, his motor cut out over Broken Bay and he was forced to crash-land his plane on a nearby cliff. Kent and his co-pilot Larry Phipps were not injured although the plane needed to be dismantled and carried through dense scrub to the nearest road. In June 1928, he and Captain Boyden took photographs of Charles Kingsford Smith's 'Southern Cross' as it came in to land at Sydney. And in 1930 he did the same when Chichester arrived in Sydney after his solo flight from England.

For some years he was an aerial photographer for the Sydney Morning Herald and he photographed the Rothbury Riots in Northern New South Wales coalfields for them. Kent submitted a series of 24 aerial photographs to an aerial photograph competition held by the Photographers Association of America in 1929 and received one of the highest awards from the association.

By the 1940s Kent was the principal aerial photographer in Sydney and his work was reproduced in thousands of advertisements in newspapers and magazines.

== Final days ==
By 1953 his son Lindsey was working with his father and the company had been renamed Milton Kent and Son. Their studio was beside his home at 19 O'Conner Street, Haberfield, Sydney. Kent continued to work with his son until 1961, when he retired.

Kent died on 13 April 1965, survived by his wife Lillian and their three children Freda, Gweneth and Lindsey. Lindsey continued to manage the studio up until 1989 when he sold the business and thousands of negatives to Ernest Dorn.

== Collections ==
- State Library of New South Wales, Milton Kent aggregated collection of negatives, chiefly aerial views of Sydney, ca. 1920-1982.
  - Collection 01: Negatives of aerial views of ***Sydney 1920-1972 and commercial photographs, ca. 1970-1982 / photographed by Milton Kent
    - Series 01 Part 01: Milton Kent glass negatives of aerial views of Sydney, 1920-1970 | Series ( Contains 38 items )
    - Series 01 Part 02: Milton Kent glass negatives of aerial views of Sydney, 1930-1970 | Series ( Contains 33 items )
    - Series 01 Part 03: Milton Kent glass negatives of aerial views of Sydney, 1940-1967 | Series ( Contains 50 items )
    - Series 01 Part 04: Milton Kent glass negatives of aerial views of Sydney, 1950-1972 | Series ( Contains 90 items )
    - Series 01 Part 05: Milton Kent glass negatives of aerial views of Sydney, 1960-1974 | Series ( Contains 14 items )
    - Series 01 Part 06: Milton Kent glass negatives of aerial views of Sydney 1970-1972 and undated sequence |
    - Series 02: Milton Kent film negatives and transparencies of Sydney factories, industrial plant and products for company publications, 1970-1982 | Series ( Contains 8 items )
    - Series 03: Milton Kent film negatives and transparencies of aerial views of Sydney, 1971-1978 and undated | ON 521
    - Series 04: Milton Kent film negatives and transparencies taken for clients, chiefly undated
    - Series 05: Milton Kent miscellaneous film negatives and transparencies, chiefly undated Collection 02: Negatives, chiefly aerial views of Sydney, ca. 1930-1970 / photographed by Milton
