= VisionMap A3 Digital Mapping System =

- Type: Airborne Digital Camera and Ground Processing System
- Area served: Worldwide
- Website: www.visionmap.com

A3 Digital Mapping System consists of a digital airborne camera and an automatic ground processing system produced by VisionMap. The A3 camera captures imagery using a sweep mechanism, which collects high resolution vertical and oblique imagery simultaneously. The captured data is post-processed by the A3 LightSpeed ground processing system in order to create the final output products. The A3 System is used by numerous national and regional mapping agencies, as well as commercial mapping firms.

== A3 Digital Mapping Camera ==
The A3 camera consists of dual CCDs with two 300mm lenses mounted on a special motor controlled axis that is attached to the frame, a fast compression and storage unit, and a dual frequency GPS. During flight, sequences of frames are exposed in a cross-track direction at a very high speed, providing a FOV of up to 106 degrees. High resolution vertical and oblique images are captured simultaneously. The camera’s wide field of view maximizes the distance between consecutive flight lines. The camera weighs 38 kilograms, and measures 50x60x60 cm.

Among the A3 System’s various final products are Super Large Frames (SLF), which are composed of all double frames of one sweep. The size of the SLF is 7,812 pixels along the flight and 62,517 pixels across the flight direction. The typical overlap between two consecutive SLFs in one strip is 30-60%. The overlap between two SLFs in adjacent flight lines is 30-60%. The SLFs may be used for stereo interpretation and stereo photogrammetry map production.

== Angular and Movement Stabilization ==
A3 Digital Mapping Camera utilizes a unique mirror based optical compensation and stabilization method for all movements potentially affecting image quality (forward motion, sweep motion, and general vibrations of the aircraft). The method uses acceleration sensors, GPS data (for aircraft velocity calculation), and the motor encoders for calculation and control of the required motion compensation. Both linear and angular compensations are done by tilting the mirror mounted on the folding optics.

== A3 LightSpeed Processing System ==
A3 LightSpeed processing system consists of a PC server configuration and software, which automatically processes data obtained during flight into photogrammetric mapping products. After a pre-process stage in which the user specifies the required outputs and output specifications, the system solves the AT and bundle adjustment automatically. Then a manual geo-referencing stage may be carried out, followed by an automatic processing of DSM, DTM and orthophoto.

== Final Products ==
A3 LightSpeed processing system produces the following output products:

1. Accurately solved vertical and oblique single images of the area of interest. The solution for each image is the result of the photogrammetric bundle block adjustment with self-calibration.
2. SLFs (Super Large Frames), used for stereo photogrammetric mapping.
3. DSM (Digital Surface Model)
4. DTM (Digital Terrain Model)
5. Orthophoto with resolution up to the source frame resolution. Global and local radiometric corrections are applied to all frames. The mosaicing process is fully automated and is based on the topographic data (DTM) and radiometric analysis of the area.

== Accuracy of Aerial Triangulation ==
In order to achieve high accuracy, all images and coordinates of projection centers, obtained by GPS, take part in the simultaneous bundle block adjustment with self-calibration. No INS is required.

As a huge number of single frames are obtained, with significant overlaps between them, a huge amount of common bundles are yielded. This leads to very high redundancy and robustness of the solved system and, therefore, to high final accuracy.

The A3 System was tested by the University of Stuttgart Institute for Photogrammetry (IFP) in their test field. The results of their test are as follows:

| Camera | Altitude(m) | GSD(cm) | RMS East(m) | RMS North(m) | RMS Z(m) |
|---|---|---|---|---|---|
| A3 | 1,972 | 6 | 0.017 | 0.023 | 0.050 |
| DMC | 870 | 8 | 0.028 | 0.044 | 0.054 |
| Ultracam-X | 1,200 | 8 | 0.060 | 0.025 | 0.044 |
| ADS40 | 770 | 8 | 0.027 | 0.031 | 0.050 |
