= Wilbur Wright und seine Flugmaschine =

1909 film

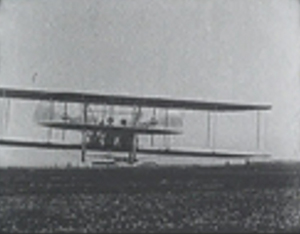
- Directed by: Anonymous
- Produced by: Société Générale des Cinématographes Eclipse
- Starring: Wilbur Wright
- Release date: 1909
- Running time: 3:28
- Country: France
- Language: Silent with soundtrack

Wilbur Wright und seine Flugmaschine (Wilbur Wright and his Flying Machine) is the German viewing market title of a short silent film made in 1909 and is considered to be the first use of motion picture aerial photography as filmed from a heavier-than-air aircraft.

It was filmed 24 April 1909 at what is now known as Centocelle Airport, near Rome, by French cinematographic company Société Générale des Cinématographes Eclipse.

The events leading up to the creation of the film began in 1908 when the Wright brothers received an invitation from the Compagnie Générale de Navigation Aérienne to ship a Wright Flyer "Model A" airplane to France and fly it at Le Mans to dispel any remaining doubt that they had indeed conquered heavier-than-air flight. Since few had witnessed their earlier successes, many in Europe were skeptical about their claims. Some skeptics in the European press went so far as to claim that the stories were a "bluff." The 30 August 1908 edition of Le Petit Journal was quoted as saying, "The experiments that Wilbur Wright is carrying out in France at the moment victoriously responded to this accusation." Among those present for the public demonstrations prior to the filming was Louis Blériot, who would cross the English Channel by plane the following year.

It begins with a shot of Wilbur Wright starting the engine; an unidentified assistant (quite likely his brother, Orville) is seen at the front of the aircraft. From there, shots of the aircraft in flight with Wright at the controls along with an unidentified passenger cut to shots of onlookers on the ground, presumably military and press liaisons. The aircraft is shown in side-to-side flybys as well as low-altitude passes directly toward and away from the camera.

The aerial shots begin at the 1:34 mark immediately after a shot of the aircraft coming to a landing directly approaching the camera. A title card appears which reads Aufnahmen von der Flugmaschine aus gemacht, or "Shots Taken from the Flying Machine." From there, the shot is of the aircraft on its launch sled as it is being prepared for takeoff. An assistant at the rear of the plane, again presumably Orville Wright, starts the engine as Wilbur Wright takes his seat at the controls. The actual onboard shots, with the camera mounted on the left lower wing near Wright's seating position begin at approximately the two-minute mark of the film as the aircraft lifts off from the launch sled. The canard, elevator and the elevator's control cord are in the foreground of the film as the Italian countryside (complete with livestock, a man on horseback and the ruins of a Roman aqueduct) passes beneath.

Wilbur Wright und seine Flugmaschine has been restored and archived by Filmarchiv Austria.
