= Centocelle Airport =

Centocelle Airport Aeroporto di Centocelle
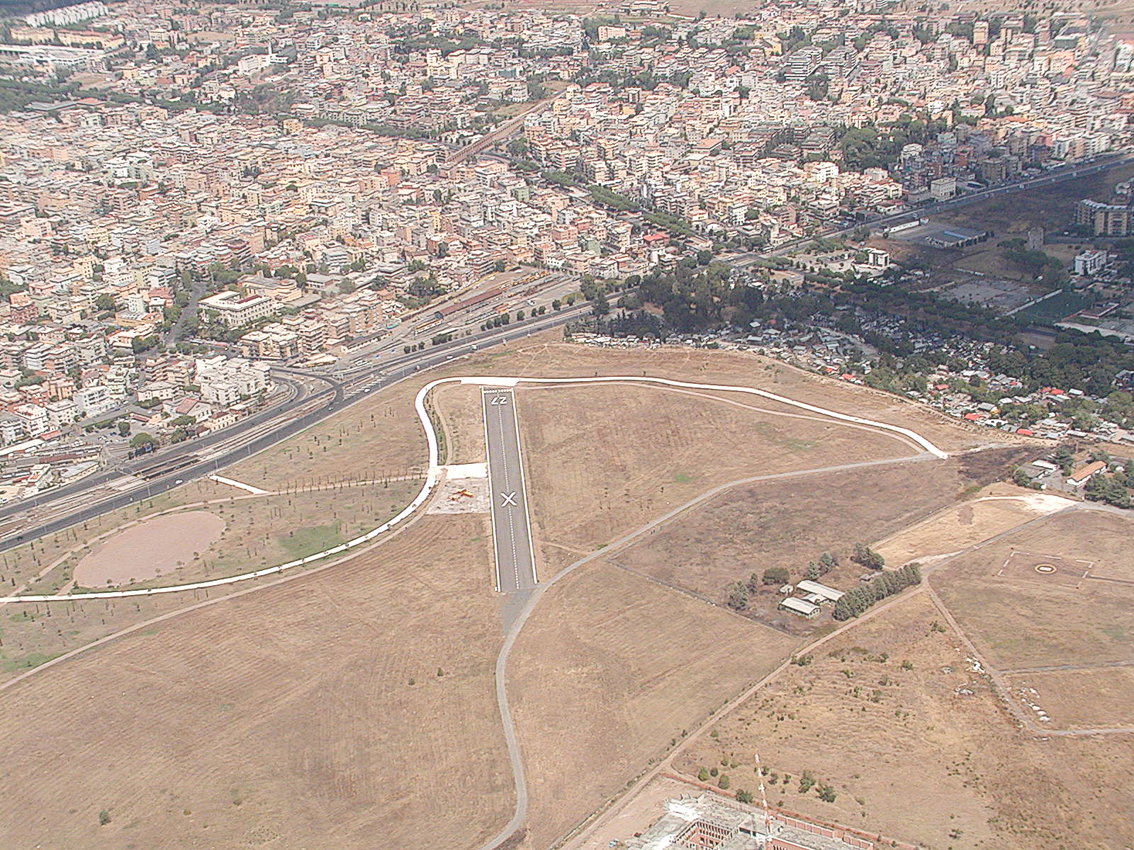
- IATA: none; ICAO: LIRC

Summary
- Airport type: Military
- Serves: Centocelle, Italy
- Coordinates: 41°52′21″N 12°33′46″E

Map
- Location of airport in Italy

Centocelle Airport (Italian: Aeroporto di Centocelle) (ICAO: LIRC) was an airport situated in Centocelle, a quarter of Rome in Italy. It is also referred to as Rome-Centocelle Airport (Aeroporto di Roma-Centocelle).

It was the first airport and flight school in Italy, opened on 15 April 1909 when Wilbur Wright came to give a demonstration of his "Flyer" airplane, footage of which appears in the early newsreel film, Wilbur Wright und seine Flugmaschine.

During World War 2, in February 1944, after news of the Allies' landing at Anzio, Luftwaffe's 1.Staffel and 2.Staffel, of Nachtschlachtgruppe (NSGr.) 9, were based at Centocelle, from where they attacked Allied units in southern Latium, mostly during moonlit night.

Its runway has been closed and converted into a park (Parco di Centocelle), but the grounds remain a base of the Italian Air Force, including active helipads.

== See also ==
- List of airports in Italy
