= Leonard Taplin =

Australian fighter ace (1895–1961)

Leonard Thomas Eaton Taplin
- Born: 16 December 1895; Unley, Adelaide, Australia
- Died: 8 July 1961 (aged 65)
- Military career
- Allegiance: Britain
- Branch: Engineers; aviation
- Service years: 1915–1919
- Rank: Lieutenant
- Nicknames: "Tap", "Taps"
- Units: No. 1 Squadron AFC, No. 4 Squadron AFC
- Awards: Distinguished Flying Cross
- Other work: Pilot with Australia's first scheduled airline service, West Australian Airways

Lieutenant Leonard Thomas Eaton Taplin (16 December 1895 – 8 July 1961) was an Australian World War I flying ace. During his service in Palestine, he helped pioneer the use of aerial photography for cartography. He then transferred to the Western Front and was credited with 12 official aerial victories. Postwar, he was an aviation pioneer in Australia, and a leading citizen in his adopted hometown.

== Early life ==
Taplin was born on 16 December 1895, his father was C. E. Taplin, an architect. On 8 May 1907, while living in Malvern, the ten-year-old Taplin broke his arm playing leap frog at school. In an early example of his courage, he first walked home, then a half mile to the doctor's, where he submitted to having the compound fractures of the bones in his arm set without anesthetic.

Taplin attended Prince Alfred College. After graduation, he took a job as assistant to his elder brother, who was engineer in charge of the Electrical Supply Company in Parramatta. He then joined the Australian Imperial Force as an engineer on 12 June 1915 so he could serve in World War I. On his enlistment form, he gave his birthplace as Adelaide and his occupation as electrical engineer. He also stated he was a natural born British subject. He listed his father, Charles Eaton Taplin, as next of kin, but also added Mrs. D. Taplin of Charing Cross, London as a second next of kin.

== World War I ==
After training in England, Taplin served nine months in France as a sapper. He applied for transfer to the Australian Flying Corps. On 8 November 1916, he was accepted for transfer. After pilot's training, he was assigned to No. 1 Squadron AFC in the Middle East as a Royal Aircraft Factory BE.2 pilot. He had not been in B Flight of the unit too long when he was in a crash near Khan Yunis. On 8 November 1917, while flying BE.2 serial number 4312 on a bombing sortie against a junction station, Taplin wrecked the plane. His observer perished in the wreck, and Taplin was seriously injured.

However, Taplin had healed enough by the New Year that he was available to be assigned by General Allenby to a pioneering use of aerial photography for mapping. In January 1918, General Allenby used five Australian pilots from No. 1 Squadron AFC to photograph a 624 square miles (1,620 km^{2}) area in Palestine as an aid to correcting and improving maps of the Turkish front. Taplin and fellow lieutenants Allan Runciman Brown, H. L. Fraser, Edward Patrick Kenny, and L. W. Rogers photographed a block of land stretching from the Turkish front lines 32 miles (51 km) deep into their rear areas. Beginning 5 January, they flew with a fighter escort to ward off enemy fighters. Using Royal Aircraft Factory BE.12 and Martinsyde airplanes, they not only overcame enemy air attacks, but also bucked 65 mile per hour winds, antiaircraft fire, and malfunctioning equipment to complete their task circa 19 January 1918.

On 17 January, during one of these photo sorties at 12,000 feet (3,700 m), Taplin was plagued by a jamming camera while mapping Nablus. He decided to hold the joystick with his knees and dismantle the camera to clear its jam. Once the camera was disassembled, he was attacked by a German Albatros. Taplin drove him away with a burst of 30 rounds of machine gun fire, then completed repair of the camera and completed his mission.

On 5 March 1918, Taplin left the Middle East for duty piloting a Sopwith Camel with No. 4 Squadron AFC at Redlington, France. He scored his first aerial victory on 17 July 1918, using Camel serial number C8226 to destroy an Albatros two-seater reconnaissance plane southwest of Estaires. On 26 July, he was taking off at 0420 hours on a dawn bombing raid with Very flares and a high explosive and a phosphorus bomb in addition to his usual load of fuel and ammunition. When his speeding Camel hit a rut and broke its landing gear axle, Taplin unfastened his safety harness and exited the crash-in-progress post haste. The ensuing explosion slightly singed the fleeing pilot.

Taplin began usage of Sopwith Camel number 1407; he would score 10 victories with it. On 30 July, he drove a Fokker D.VII down out of control; the following day, scoring twice, he drove down a Fokker D.VII and drove down another. On 7 August 1918, he set an Albatros D.V afire in the air south of Laventie, and became an ace. Two days later, using Camel number D9432, he destroyed a Hannover recon plane north of Marquillies.

On 1 September, Taplin became a balloon buster, destroying a German observation balloon over Fromelles. The next day, he shot down and wrecked a Halberstadt recon plane east of Aubers. He then ruined a balloon on the morning of 3 September, and destroyed another that same evening. Two days later, he destroyed his fourth balloon in the morning, and sent a Fokker D.VII out of control in the evening. This dogfight ended his combat career. Outnumbered by a ratio of five or six to one, Taplin and his three squadronmates fell under the guns of German fighters from Jasta 26 and Jasta 27. As the fight began at 15,000 feet (4,600 m), Taplin was shot through the right hand by German ace Christian Mesch, breaking Taplin's wrist and causing him to throw his Camel into a stall. He recovered with his left hand, then downed the Fokker that was his final win. He was then hit by another burst of fire that shattered the breech of his machine gun and sliced a shard of shrapnel into his nose. The stunned Taplin tumbled to 1,000 feet (300 m) altitude, followed by two Germans. After a skirmish with the Germans, which was settled by Taplin shooting down one of the Germans and chasing the other off, Taplin was no longer engaged by his aerial enemies. By now, the Australian was down to 100 feet (30 m), coping with a rough-running engine and one-handed piloting, and exposed to ground fire. The wounded pilot and his damaged Camel endured several miles of small arms fire while attempting to return to friendly lines. Taplin crashed several hundred yards short of the German front lines and was taken prisoner.

== Post World War I ==
Leonard Taplin would not be repatriated from his prisoner of war camp until 1919, arriving home on 23 August 1919. He joined Norman Brearley's fledgling Western Australian Airlines as a pilot for Australia's first scheduled airline. After Brearley sold out, Taplin settled in Port Hedland and became one of its leading citizens. He supplied electricity to the town, and served as both its butcher and undertaker.

Taplin's divorce from Doreen Taplin was finalized on 15 October 1924; he was ordered to pay 3 pounds 10 shillings alimony weekly until her remarriage. He died on 8 July 1961.
