= Elevated photography =

Elevated photography is the process of taking aerial photos using a telescoping pole or mast, or other aerial or elevated support systems, to emulate aerial photographs, or video, taken from a commercially licensed aircraft.

In some ways, elevated photography is more flexible than imagery taken from a commercial aircraft, or an orbiting satellite, in that it is capable of getting highly detailed images, from a birds eye view. This method allows for image collection that offers synoptic timelines – making this process a useful tool for construction management, litigation, accident investigation, real estate promotion and much more.

The price and flexibility of elevated imaging is generally quite reasonable, and it includes varying degrees of compatibility with related engineering-quality software. Because it does not involve the use of a crewed commercial aircraft, the overhead and costs associated with elevated photography should be much lower.

Elevated photography has been around for a few years; however, it is still relatively new in the United States and United Kingdom, but the concept of obtaining aerial images is not. Used extensively in areas outside the United States, it can be used in a variety of ways, but it serves as the link between getting a less than satisfying aerial image or becomes the next 'step up' from ground-level hand-held imagery.

Elevated photography is also commonly known as high-level photography and mast photography. It requires specialist equipment to carry out elevated photography safely and professionally, either van-mounted or portable masts are used, depending on location and job in hand.

One problem with elevated photography is that it is difficult to get an orthographic, or, map-like coverage of an area because most elevated photography systems only allow for a 'soda straw' way of collecting data. This can be offset by image stitching, to some degree, with new digital camera systems and software.

== Multirotor photography ==
The most common configuration is the four-rotor quadcopter design, which is the newest platform for "elevated photography". This platform has become more practical because of recent developments and improvements in Lithium polymer battery and digital Brushless DC electric motor technology.

Civil aviation authorities, and model aircraft association insurance rules, restrict operations of radio-controlled aircraft, including multicopter-carrying cameras, to line of sight (LOS) operation. For all practical purposes, the range of operation of a multicopter, carrying a camera, is limited to a few hundred meters from the operator who is holding the radio control unit. The operational range of the most common, electric-powered multicopters are well-below the operational altitude and range of commercial aircraft, which are capable of conventional aerial photography using a larger, professional cameras that are hand-held by a camera operator, or, mounted inside a gyro-stabilized platform, which are mounted on the outside of the aircraft.

== Cable-mounted camera systems ==
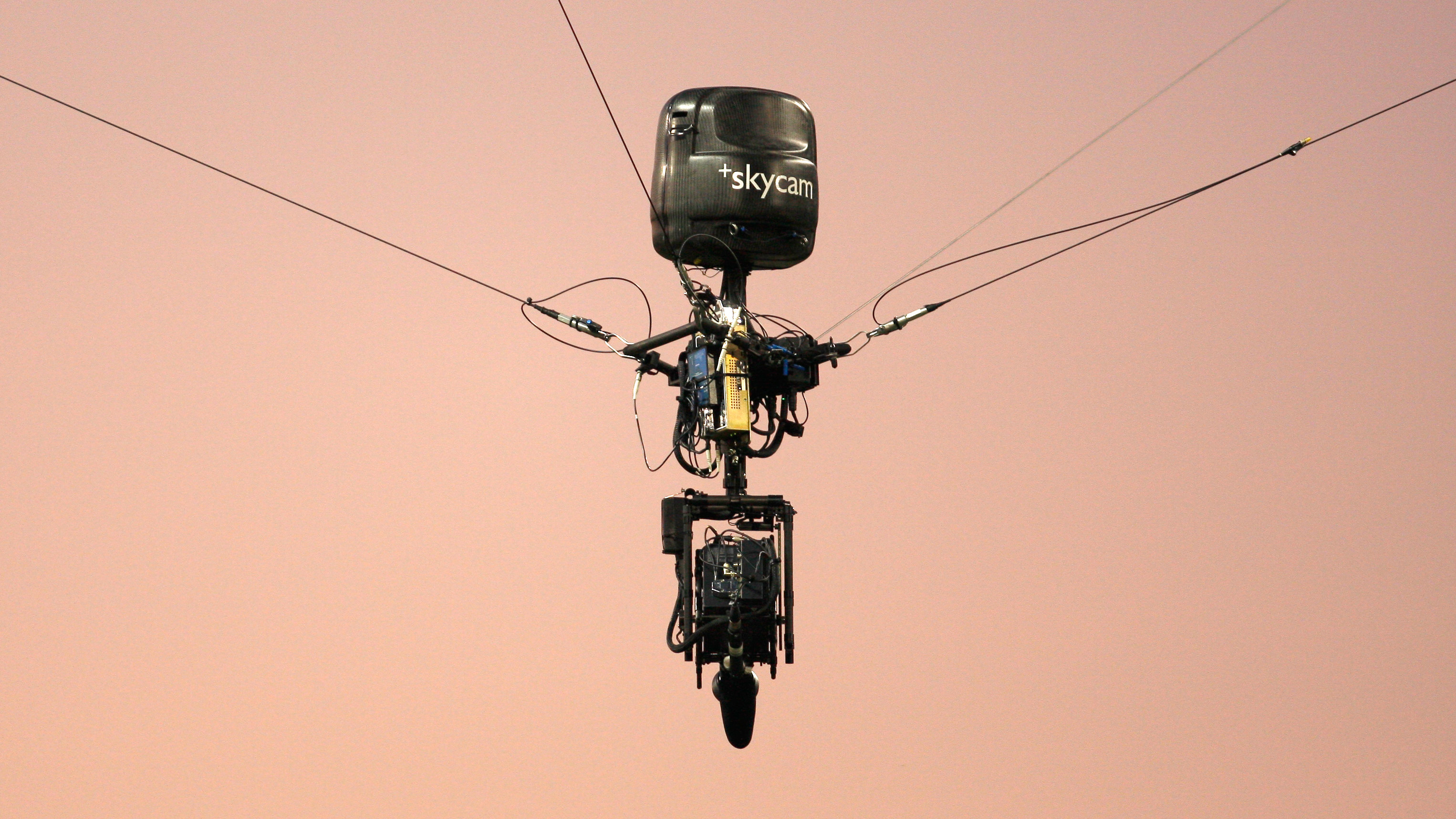
Skycam system set-up at a Washington Huskies football game, at Husky Stadium in Seattle, WA.

Skycam is the original, elevated cable-controlled camera system that was invented by Garrett Brown in 1984; who also invented the body-mounted Steadicam system.

Because of its ability to carry heavy loads and provide smooth, precise camera movements and maintain steady camera positions, the Skycam and CableCam-type systems are primarily used as a remote-controlled camera, for mobile television productions, at major stadium events. The Skycam utilizes the buildings superstructure to anchor its cable and pulley system.

The cable-mounted Skycam system can also be installed outdoors, using construction cranes that are supported by light stainless steel guy-lines, as was done in the 1984 Hollywood film "Birdy", starring Matthew Modine and Nicolas Cage.

== Telescoping mast or pole photography ==
Mast or pole photography refers to low-level, ground-based elevated or aerial photography, using a telescopic mast or pole, with a remote-controlled camera attached to the mast head, which allows a photographer to capture still and motion picture imagery, from a "birds eye view".

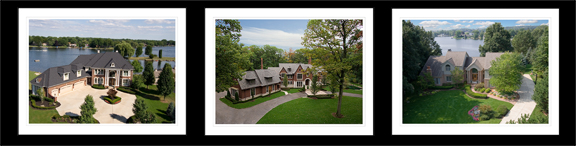

There are numerous applications for elevated photography, including:

- the real estate business
- land and commercial development
- construction companies – finished and in-progress projects
- government agency's and insurance companies;

documenting the damage caused by natural & man-made disasters

- documenting architecture and engineering projects
- imaging for advertising and marketing campaigns
- print, broadcast and social media coverage
- police investigation of crime & accident scenes
- fire marshal investigation of crime & accident scenes
- civic events, like festivals and street fairs (mostly with telescoping pole photography)
- permanently mounted traffic cameras to capture photos and video of drivers running red lights

The four main components of a mast or pole photography system are: (1) the telescoping mast or pole, (2) a high resolution digital camera that is, (3) controlled remotely with a smartphone or computer tablet running a mobile app, and (4) a remote controlled and powered pan/tilt head for pointing the camera.

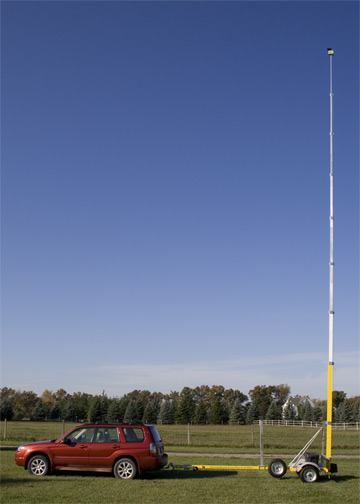
Trailer-mounted telescoping mast in the extended position.

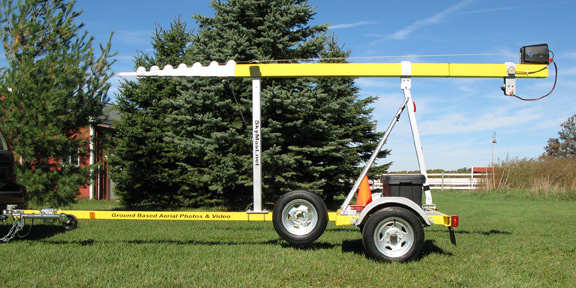
Trailer-mounted telescoping mast in the travel position

Telescoping masts come in various sizes, ranging from 20' to over 100' long or high, and can be extended, and retracted manually, mechanically or pneumatically. Mechanical masts rely on a series of simple pulleys and a 12volt electric winch to operate. Pneumatic systems incorporate a hand pump to pressurize the interior of the mast causing it to rise.

Smaller masts and poles, in 20' to 40' range, can be manually extended, locked-in-place by hand, and supported at the top-end with three guy-lines, by a single person; although having two persons involved is easier and safer.

Where speed-of-operation, portability and the ability to hoist heavier professional camera equipment are the main goals, the masts can be mounted on a specialized trailer for easy transport. The trailer mounted system is quick to set up, since no assembly is required at the site. The mast pivots near its center of gravity, requiring very little effort to move it from the travel position to the vertical position for shooting. The telescoping mast can also be mounted on a large car or a van. Larger masts can to be attached to a 4x4 vehicle for greater stability for greater safety.

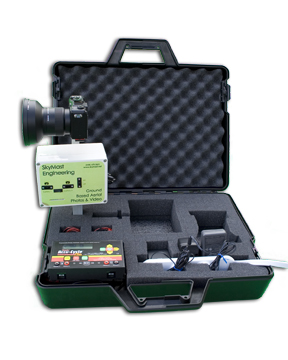
Camera mounted on the pan/tilt Head

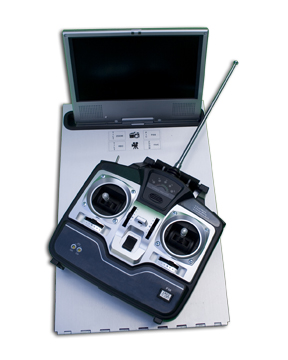
Wireless control unit with preview screen

The remote control pan/tilt head allows the camera operator to position the camera, and frame the shot, by remotely pointing the camera up-and-down and side-to-side in order to achieve the right framing. Older remote control systems use a direct wire connection to the pan/tilt head to manually control the cameras position at the top-end. Modern kits use Wireless technology, like tablets and smartphones with Wifi, BlueTooth and mobile apps that control these components using radio frequency controls. Depending on the quality of the tilt-pan head, it allows for more precise control and a greater range of movements of the pan-and-tilt controls.

The ground control unit, which is the user interface, can be a R/C hobby-type unit, or a specialized Mobile app running on a computer tablet or smartphone. It allows the photographer / operator to see what the camera sees, and being able to control the cameras position; which means framing, tilting, panning and zooming the lens in-and-out in order to compose the image; and then trigger the shutter.
