= Ken Shadbolt =

Australian rules footballer

Personal information
- Full name: Colin Kenneth Shadbolt
- Born: 9 October 1921; South Melbourne, Victoria
- Died: 21 April 2012 (aged 90)

Playing career^{1}
Years	Club	Games (Goals)
1943	Melbourne	2 (0)
- ^{1} Playing statistics correct to the end of 1943.

Ken Shadbolt (9 October 1921 – 21 April 2012) was an Australian rules footballer who played with Melbourne in the Victorian Football League (VFL).
