= Loomis Shadbolt =

American politician

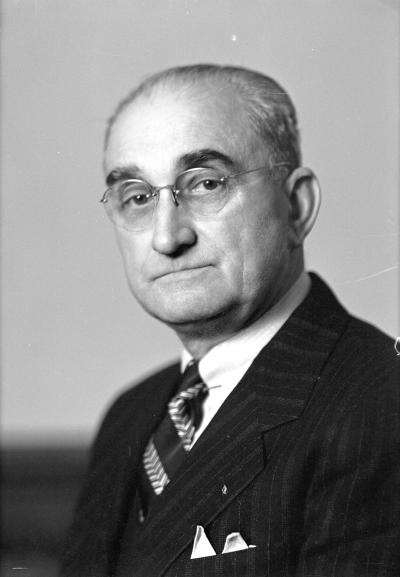
- Shadbolt in 1947

Member of the Washington House of Representatives for the 14th district
- In office 1941–1953

Personal details
- Born: May 11, 1883 Sheboygan, Wisconsin, United States
- Died: March 9, 1963 (aged 79) Yakima, Washington, United States
- Party: Republican

Loomis James Shadbolt (May 11, 1883 – March 9, 1963) was an American politician in the state of Washington. He served in the Washington House of Representatives from 1941 to 1953.
