= George Shadbolt =

British photographer and botanist (1817–1901)

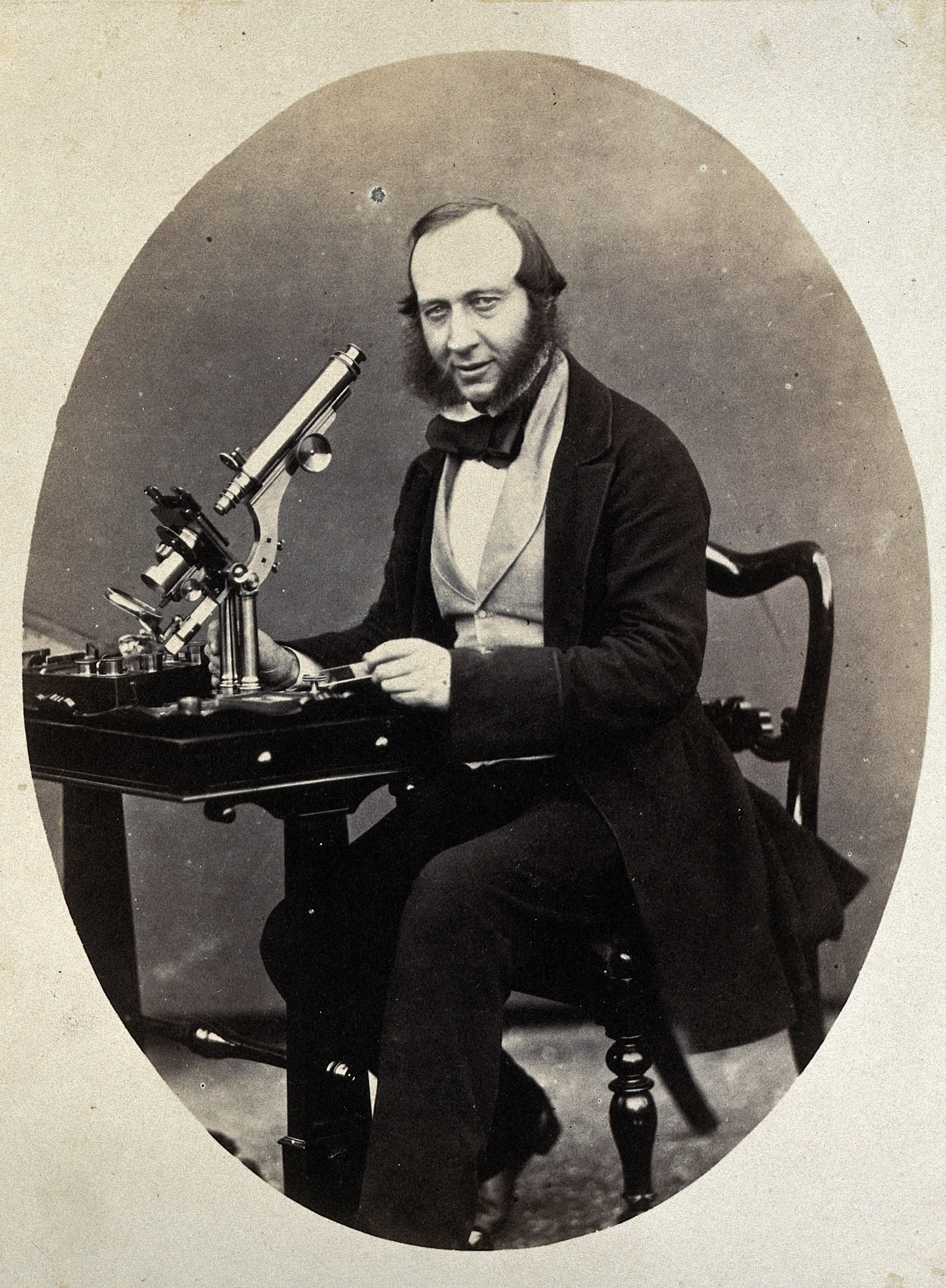

A photograph by George Shadbolt, entitled Country Lane, likely to have been taken in the area of Hornsey, North London.

George Shadbolt (1817–1901) was a British writer, editor, student of optics and photographer with a strong interest in innovative techniques, who was active during the 1850s–1860s. Reported to have made the first microphotograph, he was also an early advocate of photographic enlargement, as well as compound and combination printing. Shadbolt's dislike of the glare of albumen printing paper led him to forsake it for salted paper. His technical interests probably motivated his praise of Henry Peach Robinson, whose combination prints were highly controversial. For seven years Shadbolt was editor of the publication that later became the British Journal of Photography. One of his sons, Cecil V. Shadbolt, is remembered as a contributor to balloon photography.

After 1864, Shadbolt's success as a mahogany dealer prompted him to retire from photography, although he maintained his professional affiliations. One of the founders of the Photographic Society of London (later the Royal Photographic Society), he also was active in the Amateur Photographic Association and the Photographic Exchange Club.

Cecil predeceased him, and was buried, alongside members of his family, at West Norwood Cemetery. Shadbolt was later buried in an adjacent plot, grave 29,652, square 113.

From about 1880 until the early 1890s George Shadbolt and his family lived at "Beechcroft' on Lubbock Road, Chislehurst, Kent.

== Sources ==
- Wood, Derek. A History of Early British Photography
