= Cecil Shadbolt =

British photographer (1859–1892)

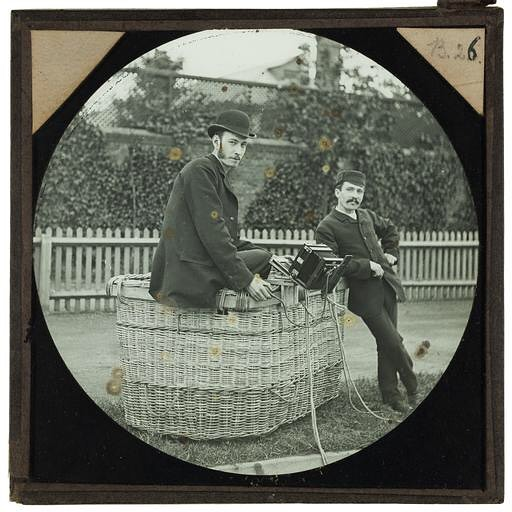
- Cecil Shadbolt (left) and 'Captain' William Dale (right) posed in the basket of a gas balloon. Shadbolt's camera can be seen, attached to the side of the basket.
- Born: 1859
- Died: 8 July 1892 (aged 33)
- Occupation: Photographer
- Parent(s): George Shadbolt

Cecil Victor Shadbolt (1859 – 8 July 1892) was a British photographer, who pioneered aerial photography from flying balloons.

== Life ==
Shadbolt was born in 1859, the son of the mahogany dealer and photographer George Shadbolt.

He showed photographs of Welsh landscapes at the 1877 Photographic Society exhibition.

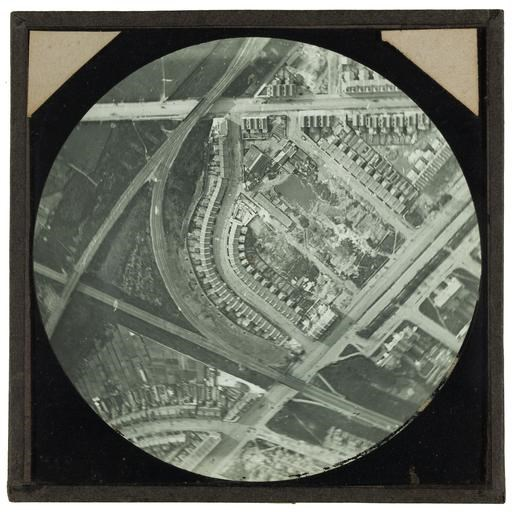
Aerial view showing Stonebridge Road, Stamford Hill, and Seven Sisters Curve, part of the Tottenham and Hampstead Junction Railway, taken from 2000ft. Taken on 29 May 1882, this is the earliest extant aerial photograph taken in the British Isles.

His first balloon ascent was in May 1882, at Alexandra Palace. He made his own device for attaching a camera to the basket below a balloon, allowing him to take pictures looking directly downwards. One of his images, taken from 2,000 feet (610 m) over Stamford Hill, is the earliest extant aerial photograph taken in the British Isles. A print of the same image, An Instantaneous Map Photograph taken from the Car of a Balloon, 2,000 feet high, was shown at the 1882 Photographic Society exhibition.

Shadbolt gave public lectures, using magic lantern slides, with the title Balloons and Ballooning, Upward and Onwards.

He was secretary of the West Kent Sunday School Union from 1886.

== Death ==
On 29 June 1892, he took a flight in a gas balloon owned by (or which he co-owned with; sources vary) his friend 'Captain' William D. Dale, at Crystal Palace. The balloon ripped during the initial ascent, at around 600 feet (180 m), and though those aboard dropped ballast, the basket crashed to the ground, immediately killing Dale. Shadbolt and the other passengers were taken to Norwood Cottage Hospital, but Shadbolt died on 8 July, aged 33. He was buried, alongside members of his family, in grave 1,932, square 113, at West Norwood Cemetery. His father was later buried in the adjacent plot.

An inquest at the hospital, on 12 July 1892, under coroner, Mr Jackson, returned verdicts of accidental death.

== Shadbolt Collection ==
The Shadbolt Collection of 76 glass lantern slides taken between 1882 and 1892 is held by Historic England, The slides were found at a car boot sale and subsequently purchased at auction by Historic England in 2015.

== Publications ==
- Harper, Henry Andrew (1888). Walks in Palestine. Religious Tract Society. – includes 24 photogravures by Shadbolt
  - An 1894 edition was subtitled "With a Portrait and Brief Memoir of the Late Cecil V. Shadbolt".
