= Edward Patrick Kenney =

Australian flying ace (1887–1976)

Edward Patrick Kenny alias Edward Patrick Kenney
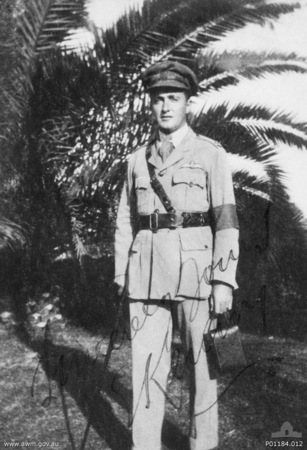
- Born: 6 September 1887; Trafalgar, Victoria, Australia
- Died: 10 March 1976 (aged 88); Brisbane City, Queensland, Australia
- Military career
- Allegiance: Australia
- Branch: Cavalry; aviation
- Service years: 1915 - 1919
- Rank: Lieutenant
- Units: Fourth Light Horse Regiment, No. 1 Squadron AFC
- Awards: Distinguished Flying Cross

Lieutenant Edward Patrick Kenny (6 September 1887 – 10 March 1976) was an Australian World War I flying ace credited with seven aerial victories. He served in Egypt with 1 Squadron in 1918 and returned to Australia on 5 March 1919.
