= Black powder rocket motor =

Rocket motor

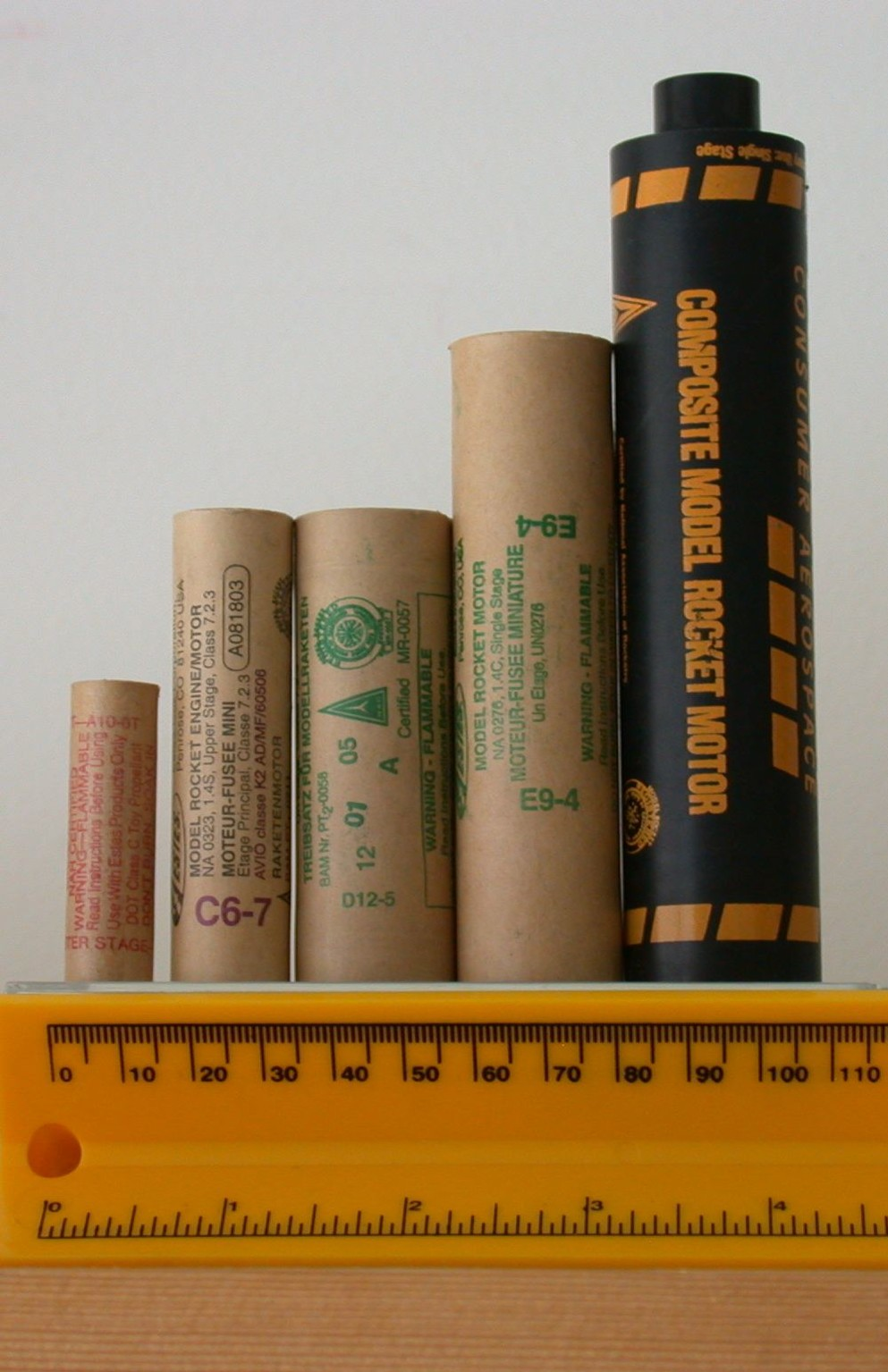
The four leftmost motors are Estes black powder rocket motors.

A black powder rocket motor propels a model rocket using black powder. Black powder rocket propellants consist of charcoal, sulfur, and potassium nitrate.

Black powder rocket motors were created in a primitive form by the Chinese in the early 13th century, and through the years refinements have been made and several uses created. They have been used for weapons and surveillance devices as well as recreation.

Black powder rocket motors are only produced in small sizes, to reduce the risk of explosion and a loss of efficiency. Black powder rockets are produced in classes 1/8 A through F. Larger sizes of model rocket motors use ammonium perchlorate composite propellant, or other composite fuels that contain ammonium nitrate.

== History ==
Black powder in rockets preceded its use in firearms. By 1045, the Chinese were producing black powder. In the early thirteenth century the Chinese made propelled objects using black powder, which was formerly used exclusively for entertainment purposes. The first recorded use of rockets in military weapons was in 1232. The Chinese ‘arrows of fire’ were fired from a sort of catapult launcher. The black powder was packed in a closed tube that had a hole in one end, and a long stick as an elementary stability and guidance system.

Black powder had a very low specific impulse, however. Refinements in rocket design were made over the next few hundred years. In 1591 a Belgian, Jean Beavie, described and sketched the important idea of multistage rockets. By 1600, rockets were being used in various parts of Europe against cavalry. By 1688, rockets weighing over 120 pounds had been built and fired with success in Germany. These German rockets, carrying 16-pound warheads, used wooden powder cases reinforced with linen.

Black powder rockets reached a new level of performance with the introduction of iron hulls and high-pressure combustion, developed in India by the engineers of Tipu Sultan. With a range of a kilometer, his rocket-propelled grenades and incendiaries took British invaders by surprise during the Anglo-Mysore Wars. Impressed by these weapons, a London lawyer, Sir William Congreve, became fascinated by the challenge of improving rockets. He experimented with propellants and case design. His systematic approach to the problem resulted in improved range, guidance (stabilization), and incendiary capabilities. The British armed forces used Congreve's new rockets to great advantage during the Napoleonic Wars.

In 1939, researchers at the California Institute of Technology seeking to develop a high-performance solid rocket motor to assist aircraft take-off, combined black powder with common road asphalt to produce the first true composite motor. This was the birth of the true composite motor and marked the end of the use of black powder in major rocketry applications. This was also the beginning of the Jet Propulsion Laboratory, and the source of its name.

== Formulations ==
Black powder rocket propellant is very similar in makeup to old-fashioned gunpowder. The main difference is the presence of a binder, usually dextrin. The commonly used Estes model rocket engines are made with black powder propellant. Black powder propellant must be pressed very tightly in order to function well. Motors designed with black powder are most often end-burners, due to the fast burn rate of this propellant. A simple dextrin-free version (the most commonly used formulation) incorporates 75% potassium nitrate, 10% sulphur, and 15% charcoal. Dextrin may be added as desired (usually between 0 and 5%). Additional (coarse) charcoal or metal powders (5 - 10%) may be added to obtain an interesting spark trail. However, this may alter slightly the burn rate of the mixture.

== Performance ==
The impulse (area under the thrust-time curve) of a rocket motor is used to determine its class. Black powder motors are divided into classes from 1/8A to F, which covers an impulse range of 0 to 80 N·s (newton-seconds).

Class	Total Impulse (Ns)
1/8A	0 – 0.3125
1/4A	0.3126 – 0.625
1/2A	0.626 – 1.25
A	1.26 – 2.50
B	2.51 – 5.00
C	5.01 – 10.00
D	10.01 – 20.00
E	20.01 – 40.00
F	40.01 – 80.00

Figures from tests of Estes rocket motors are used in the following examples of rocket motor performance.

For miniature black powder rocket motors (13 mm diameter), the maximum thrust is between 5 and 12 N, the total impulse is between 0.5 and 2.2 N·s, and the burn time is between 0.25 and 1 second. For Estes ‘regular size’ rocket motors (18 mm diameter), there are three classes: A, B, and C. The A class 18 mm motors have a maximum thrust between 9.5 and 9.75 N, a total impulse between 2.1 and 2.3 N·s, and a burn time between 0.5 and 0.75 seconds. The B class 18 mm motors have a maximum thrust between 12.15 and 12.75 N, a total impulse between 4.2 and 4.35 N·s, and a burn time between 0.85 and 1 second. The C class 18mm motors have a maximum thrust from 14 – 14.15 N, a total impulse between 8.8 and 9 N·s, and a burn time between 1.85 and 2 seconds.

There are also 3 classes included in Estes large (24 mm diameter) rocket motors: C, D, and E. The C class 24 mm motors have a maximum thrust between 21.6 and 21.75 N, a total impulse of between 8.8 and 9 N·s, and a burn time between 0.8 and 0.85 seconds. The D class 24 mm motors have a maximum thrust between 29.7 and 29.8 N, a total impulse between 16.7 and 16.85 N·s, and a burn time between 1.6 and 1.7 seconds. The E class 24 mm motors have a maximum thrust between 19.4 and 19.5 N, a total impulse between 28.45 and 28.6 N·s, and a burn time between 3 and 3.1 seconds. Estes also produces 29mm black powder motors in E and F classes. The F class motors have a total impulse of 50 Newton-seconds and contain 60 grams of black powder propellant. Larger black powder motors are not practical in the United States because explosives laws limit consumer class black powder motors to 62.5 grams of propellant. Larger amounts of propellant would require users to obtain an explosives permit from the Bureau of Alcohol, Tobacco, Firearms, and Explosives. Motors containing more than 62.5 grams of propellant usually rely on ammonium perchlorate composite propellant because that propellant is exempt from regulation as an explosive.

== See also ==
- Rocket candy
