= NARAM =

NARAM is the Annual Meet of the National Association of Rocketry (NAR). It is the national contest culminating the rocket contest year, and also includes fun, or "sport," flying of model rockets for those who don't wish to compete. The NAR is the governing body for the sport/hobby of model rocketry in the United States. NARAM is traditionally held the first week of August.

== History ==
The first NARAM was held in Denver, Colorado, in 1959 hosted by the Mile-HI section (#1). G. Harry Stine served as the contest director. NARAM-2 was hosted by the Peak City Section (#2) in Colorado Springs and the CD was William S. Roe, a co-founder of the NAR. Fifty years later, NARAM-50 was held at Great Meadow in The Plains, Virginia. NARAM-52, in Pueblo, CO was a tribute to William S. Roe.

Here is a list of NARAMs by year and location and who was the contest director:

- NARAM-1, 1959, Denver, CO. Contest Director - G. Harry Stine
- NARAM-2, 1960, Colorado Springs, CO. Contest Director - William S. Roe
- NARAM-3, 1961, Denver, CO. Contest Director - J. Delano Hitch
- NARAM-4, 1962, USAF Academy, CO. Contest Director - Capt. Vernon VanVonderen
- NARAM-5, 1963, Bedford, MA. Contest Director - Marshall P. Wilder
- NARAM-6, 1964, Wallops Island, VA. Contest Director - Dr. William B. Rich
- NARAM-7, 1965, Aberdeen, MD. Contest Director - Howard Galloway
- NARAM-8, 1966, Clinton Co AFB, OH. Contest Director - G. Harry Stine
- NARAM-9, 1967, Mankato, MN. Contest Director - Dr. Ellsworth Beech
- NARAM-10, 1968, Wallops Island, VA. Contest Director - James S. Barrowman
- NARAM-11, 1969, USAF Academy, CO. Contest Director - William S. Roe
- NARAM-12, 1970, Houston, TX. Contest Director - Richard Sipes
- NARAM-13, 1971, Aberdeen, MD. Contest Director - Howard Galloway
- NARAM-14, 1972, Seattle, WA. Contest Director - Jess Medina
- NARAM-15, 1973, Columbus, OH. Contest Director - Dr. Gerald Gregorek
- NARAM-16, 1974, Manassas, VA. Contest Director - Col. Howard Kuhn
- NARAM-17, 1975, Orlando, FL. Contest Director - Richard Q. Fox
- NARAM-18, 1976, Center Valley, PA. Contest Director - Carl J. Warner
- NARAM-19, 1977, Overland Park, KS. Contest Director - Douglas R. Pratt
- NARAM-20, 1978, Anaheim, CA. Contest Director - Larry L. Chaney
- NARAM-21, 1979, Houston, TX. Contest Director - Robert Justis
- NARAM-22, 1980, East Lansing, MI. Contest Director - Keith Campbell
- NARAM-23, 1981, Center Valley, PA. Contest Director - Charlie Sykos
- NARAM-24, 1982, Orlando, FL. Contest Director - Richard Q. Fox
- NARAM-25, 1983, Houston, TX. Contest Director - Ronald Goforth
- NARAM-26, 1984, Center Valley, PA. Contest Director - Charlie Sykos
- NARAM-27, 1985, Houston, TX. Contest Director - Scott Hunsicker
- NARAM-28, 1986, Chanute AFB, IL. Contest Director - Mark Bundick
- NARAM-29, 1987, Irvine, CA. Contest Director - Martin Bowitz
- NARAM-30, 1988, Huntsville, AL. Contest Director - Matt Steele
- NARAM-31, 1989, Manassas, VA. Contest Director - Trip Barber
- NARAM-32, 1990, Dallas, TX Contest Director- Scott Hunsicker
- NARAM-33, 1991, Elgin, IL. Contest Director - Mark Bundick
- NARAM-34, 1992, Las Vegas, NV. Contest Director - Bob Sanford
- NARAM-35, 1993, Frederick, MD. Contest Director - Tom Lyon
- NARAM-36, 1994, Houston, TX. Contest Director - Terry White
- NARAM-37, 1995, Geneseo, NY. Contest Director - Dan Wolf
- NARAM-38, 1996, Evansville, IN. Contest Director - Chad Ring
- NARAM-39, 1997, Tucson, AZ. Contest Director - Steve Lubliner
- NARAM-40, 1998, Muncie, IN. Contest Director - Glenn Feveryear
- NARAM-41, 1999, Pittsburgh, PA. Contest Director - Rod Schafer
- NARAM-42, 2000, Estesland, CO. Contest Director - Ken Mizoi
- NARAM-43, 2001, Geneseo, NY. Contest Director - John Viggiano
- NARAM-44, 2002, McGregor, TX. Contest Director - Scott Hunsicker
- NARAM-45, 2003, Evansville, IN. Contest Director - Lila Schmaker
- NARAM-46, 2004, The Plains, VA. Contest Director - Jonathan Rains
- NARAM-47, 2005, West Chester, OH. Contest Director - Mark Fisher
- NARAM-48, 2006, Phoenix, AZ. Contest Director - Matt Steele
- NARAM-49, 2007, Kalamazoo, MI Contest Director- Randy Boadway
- NARAM-50, 2008, The Plains, VA. Contest Director - Jim Filler
- NARAM-51, 2009, Johnstown, PA. Contest Director - Steve Foster
- NARAM-52, 2010, Pueblo, CO. Contest Director - Michael (Mike) Vaughn Konshak
- NARAM-53, 2011, Lebanon, OH. Contest Director - Chan Stevens
- NARAM-54, 2012, Muskegon, MI. Contest Director- Pam Gilmore
- NARAM-55, 2013, Aurora, OH. Contest Director- Bob Ferrante
- NARAM-56, 2014, Pueblo, CO. Contest Director - Dr. Ryan Coleman. Honorary Contest Directors: Vern & Gleda Estes.
- NARAM-57, 2015, Tucson, AZ. Contest Director - Ed LaCroix
- NARAM-58, 2016, Walnut Grove, MO. Contest Director - John Buckley
- NARAM-59. 2017 Muskegon, MI. Contest Director - Peter Alway
- NARAM-60, 2018 Pueblo, CO. Contest Director - Scott Alexander
- NARAM-61, 2019 Muncie, IN. Contest Director - Brian Guzek
- NARAM-62, 2021 Geneseo, NY Contest Director - Dan Wolf (postponed from 2020 due to COVID-19)
- NARAM-63, 2022 Springfield, MO. Contest Director - Chad Ring
- NARAM-64, 2023 Lordsburg, NM. Contest Director - Vern Richardson
- NARAM-65, 2024 Pueblo, CO. Contest Director - Scott Hunsicker
- NARAM-66, 2025 Muncie, IN. Contest Director - Steve Foster
- NARAM-67, 2026 Muncie, IN. Contest Director - Matt Steele
