= Orville Carlisle =

American shoe salesman and inventor

Orville H. Carlisle (July 5, 1917 – August 1, 1988) was a shoe salesman in Norfolk, Nebraska known for inventing the hobby that would become known as model rocketry.

== Life and career ==
In 1953, Orville and his brother, Robert Carlisle, were joint owners of a shoe store on 420 Norfolk Ave. Robert, a model aviation enthusiast, demonstrated his "U-control" planes for groups in parks and schools in and around Norfolk, to demonstrate advances in aeronautical technology since World War II. He wanted a model missile for use in his demonstrations, to illustrate rocketry technology (which would, in a few years, lead to the beginning of the Space Age). He called on Orville, whose hobby was pyrotechnics, to build him a rocket.

By 1954, Orville had developed his first rocket, the Rock-A-Chute Mark I. This model had an airframe of paper with balsa fins mounted on long booms behind the body. Propulsion was achieved by a handmade solid rocket motor burning DuPont fffG black powder propellant. The engine was used once and then discarded. The same technology goes into model rocket engines produced currently.

Carlisle's second rocket, the Rock-A-Chute Mark II had a more streamlined design and is still a practical model rocket today. In 1958, he was awarded U.S. patent 2,841,084 for his design of a "toy rocket". G. Harry Stine, in an article published posthumously in Sport Rocketry magazine, wrote that the U.S. Patent Office should not have awarded Carlisle the patent because the design merely represented a reasonable extension of existing fireworks technology.

Prior to the launch of Sputnik in 1957, Carlisle read an article in the February 1957 issue of Popular Mechanics by G. Harry Stine, then an engineer working at White Sands Missile Range. The article remarked on the danger that individuals (mostly teenage boys), inspired by the birth of the Space Age, might experiment with rockets of their own design and end up seriously hurting themselves or even dying. Carlisle realized that he had a solution to this problem with his "Rock-A-Chute" models and engines, a few of which he boxed up and shipped to Stine.

Stine saw the potential in Carlisle's invention as a safe hobby, and together they formed the first model rocket company, Model Missiles, Inc., in Denver, Colorado. Carlisle offered two kits from his new company: the Rock-A-Chute Mark II and a scale model of the Aerobee sounding rocket. Soon, the demand for model rocket kits and engines exceeded the production capabilities, and Carlisle sought an external supplier for rocket engines. Vernon Estes, whose family fireworks company was listed first in the Denver phone book, designed a machine capable of producing rocket engines every 5.5 seconds. Unwise business decisions eventually forced Model Missiles, Inc. out of business, and Estes took over production with his own company, Estes Industries.

Orville Carlisle became the first member of the National Association of Rocketry (NAR #1), founded in 1957 by G. Harry Stine. Later, he served as a member of the Technical Committee on Pyrotechnics of the National Fire Protection Agency.

Only two original "Rock-A-Chute" models survived, both of which are preserved in the National Air and Space Museum.
