= Pershing missile models =

There are a number of Pershing missile models of the Pershing 1 and Pershing 1a Field Artillery Missile Systems and of the Pershing II Weapon System.

== Scale models ==
=== I Love Kit ===
- 63527 M1001 w/M790 Erector Lanucher Trailer 1:35.

=== Modelcollect ===
- UA72077 USA M983 HEMTT Tractor with Pershing II Missile Erector Launcher 1:72 (2016). Includes the M983 HEMTT which was used only in the US but is missing the generator and crane.
- AS72101 U.S. Army M1001 tractor and Pershing II tactical missile, 1st Battalion, 9th Field Artillery, Wiley Barracks, Neu Ulm 1:72 (2018). Pre-built model with the M1001 MAN.
- AS72110 U.S. Army M983 Hemtt tractor and Pershing II tactical missile 1:72 (2018) Pre-built model with the M983 HEMTT and includes the generator and crane. Discontinued.
- UA72084 NATO M1001 MAN Tractor & Pershing II Missile Erector Launcher 1:72 (2018). Includes the M1001 MAN which was used only in West Germany and includes the generator and crane.
- UA72166 USA M983 HEMTT Tractor with Pershing II Missile Erector Launcher 1:72 (2019). Includes the M983 HEMTT with the generator and crane.

=== Tetra Model Works ===
- ME-72007 is an upgrade kit for the Modelcollect Pershing II with HEMTT. It has better catwalks and work platform, the hydraulic pump cover, the pallet motor cover and parts for the HEMTT.
- ME-72010 is an upgrade kit for the Modelcollect Pershing II with MAN. It has better catwalks and work platform, the hydraulic pump cover, the pallet motor cover and parts for the MAN.

=== Arsenal M ===
- MGM-31 PERSHING II auf TEL, komplett neues RP-Modell 1:87 (2016). Discontinued.

=== Monogram ===
Monogram released several kits with multiple missiles on a base. All have been discontinued.

- PS221 U.S. Space Missiles 1:128 (1969); 36 U.S. missiles on display base; includes Pershing 1
- 6055 U.S. Space Missiles 1:128; (1983); Heritage Edition; re-release of PS-221
- 6019 U.S. and U.S.S.R. Missiles 1:144 (1993); Nine U.S. missiles and eleven Soviet missiles on display base; includes Pershing II
- 7860 USA/USSR Missile Set 1:144; Re-release of 6019

=== H&K-87 ===
H&K-87 specialized in 1:87 military models. The company was sold to United Fun in 1988. All Pershing models have been discontinued.

Pershing 1

- HK-1315 M474 complete Pershing battery on M474 carrier 1:87

Pershing 1a

- HK-1316 Pershing battery, launching vehicle with missile 1:87
- HK-1317 Pershing battery, carrier vehicle with missile head 1:87
- HK-1318 Pershing battery, radio carrier vehicle 1:87
- HK-1319 Pershing battery, radar carrier vehicle 1:87

Pershing 1a; mistakenly listed as Pershing II

- HK-1331 Pershing II battery, M757 truck-tractor with M757A1 semitrailer + Pershing II missile 1:87
- HK-1332 Pershing II battery, M656 8x8 truck with radio shelter 1:87
- HK-1323 Pershing II battery, M656 8x8 truck with radar shelter 1:87
- HK-1324 Pershing II battery, M791 8x8 command truck with expandable van 1:87

=== United Fun ===
United Fun purchased H&K-87 in 1988. They carried the Pershing 1a series for a time but they are now discontinued.

- HK-01321 Pershing 1A - KHD Tractor + Launcher Trailer XM657 1:87
- HK-01333 Ford 8x8 M-656 Radar carrier 1:87
- HK-01334 Ford 8x8 M-656 Command shelter 1:87

=== Martin Marietta ===
Martin Marietta's Engineering Prototype Laboratory created a model in the 1970s. Discontinued. One of these models was held by the CIA.

- EPL-1 Pershing 1a with erector launcher 1:32 (1973)

=== Shizukyo ===
- TS-105 XM474E2 Pershing Missile System 1:25; Pershing 1 on M474 transporter erector launcher. The box mistakenly states 1:250. This is a motorized model and extremely rare. Discontinued.

=== Marco's Miniatures ===
- MR4501 1:32 Pershing 1a with erector launcher. Discontinued.

== Flying model rockets ==
=== The Launch Pad ===
- KO46 Pershing MGM-31A 1:10.553

=== Polecat Aerospace ===
Polecat produced the Pershing II from 2008 to 2010.

- Pershing II 5.5" diameter. Discontinued.

=== Estes ===
Estes Industries produced the Pershing 1a from 1974 to 1983

- 1268 Maxi-Brute Series Pershing 1-A 1:10. Discontinued.

=== Boyce Aerospace Hobbies ===
- Pershing 1A 1:70 (1997). Discontinued.
- Pershing 1A 1:15 (2017)
- Pershing 1A 1:10

=== Neubauer Rockets ===
- Pershing 1A 1:70 (1997); transferred from Boyce. Discontinued.
- Micro Pershing 1A 1:49. Discontinued.

== Presentation models ==
=== Topping ===
Topping Models produced several versions of Pershing for presentation use. Several examples are in the collection of the National Air and Space Museum.

=== Model and Pattern Works ===
Model & Pattern Works is run by Pershing veteran Steve Mackay who produces high quality wooden models.

- Pershing 1a on erector launcher
- Pershing 2 on erector launcher

== Gaming models ==
=== Shapeways ===
Shapeways has several small scale models mainly intended for gaming.

- MGM-131 Pershing 1 Battery 1:285
- PGM-11 Redstone & MGM-31 Pershing 1:285
- MGM-31 Pershing 1:285
- MGM-31 Pershing 1:200
- Pershing 1-A PTS/PS Truck
- Pershing 2 Missile Battery 1:700
- Pershing 2 Missile Battery 1:600
- Pershing 2 Missile Battery 1:350

== Other ==
Martin and Martin Marietta built large-scale models as demonstrators and as training aids for the military. A Pershing 1a model is in the collection of the U.S. Army Artillery Museum at Fort Sill, Oklahoma. A Pershing II model was built for the East German Spetsnaz for training.
