= National Association of Rocketry =

U.S. nonprofit organization

- Abbreviation: NAR
- Formation: 1957
- Type: Club (hobbyist)
- Headquarters: Marion, Iowa, U.S.
- Region served: USA
- Members: 8,850
- President: John Hochheimer
- Main organ: Board of Trustees
- Website: nar.org

The National Association of Rocketry (NAR) is a non-profit tax-exempt scientific organization dedicated to consumer safety, youth education, and the advancement of technology in the hobby of sport rocketry in the United States. Founded in 1957, the NAR is the oldest and largest spacemodeling organization in the world with over 8,000 members and 200 affiliated clubs (known as Sections) across the U.S. It was established in 1957 by Orville Carlisle and G. Harry Stine. It supports all aspects of safe consumer sport rocket flying, from small model rockets with youth groups to very large high-power rockets flown by adult hobbyists.

The NAR is a recognized national authority for performance and reliability certification of consumer rocket motors and for the certification of high-power rocket fliers in the U.S. The NAR is the author of a Model Rocket Safety Code for consumer model rocketry and a High Power Rocket Safety Code for high-power sport rocketry that are recognized and accepted by manufacturers and public safety officials nationwide. The NAR plays a strong role in the establishment of national rocketry safety standards for public safety officials through its participation in the National Fire Protection Association.

== Governance ==
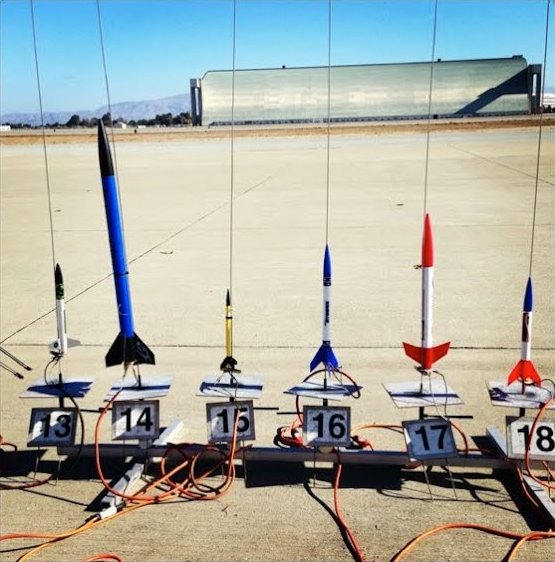
A rack of low-power model rockets ready for flight at a club launch

The NAR is governed by a board of trustees consisting of nine senior members (age 21 and over) of the NAR, elected by vote of members age 16 and older. Trustees have terms of three years, with three of the nine positions coming up for election each year. The president, vice president, secretary, and treasurer of the NAR are elected by the board from within these nine. The president is the chief operating officer on a day-to-day basis and is authorized to transact the NAR's business as directed by the board of trustees and in accordance with the NAR's by-laws.

The NAR board meets twice per year, just before NARCON in the late winter and NARAM in midsummer. These meetings provide direction to the president, establish the NAR's policies, and oversee its finances. In between board meetings, a board-approved executive committee of three trustees is empowered to act in the stead of the board, subject to ratification of any actions by the board at its next meeting.

Most of the NAR's services are delivered through standing committees. These committees report to the board of trustees via an assigned liaison or are headed by a Trustee directly. The current standing committees include Membership, Education, Technical Services (“NARTS”), NARTREK (skills education program), National Events, Periodicals, Section Activities, High Power Rocketry Services, Standards and Testing, Safety, and NAR Historian.

Ad-hoc committees may be established from time to time to address temporary or one-time requirements. A Special Committee for the Enhancement of National Events is currently exploring ways to attract more members to the NAR's national events and to encourage greater participation in rocketry competition.

== Education and outreach ==
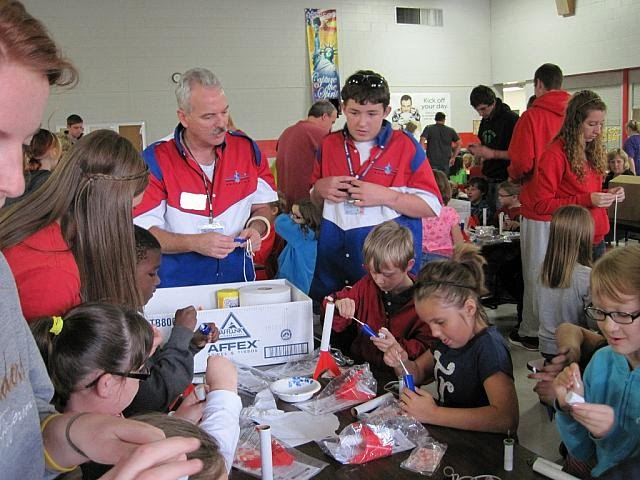
Two NAR members lead a rocket building session for a group of elementary school students

=== NAR Scholarship ===
The NAR Scholarship program was announced at NARAM-43 in 2001. A limited number of $2000 scholarships are available each year to NAR members between the ages of 17 and 22 who are planning to attend, or are currently enrolled in a college, university or technical school. The number of awards is determined annually by the board of trustees, and scholarships are presented annually at NARAM.

=== Robert L. Cannon Educator Award ===
In 2001, the NAR instituted the Robert L. Cannon Educator Award in memory of Bob Cannon, who spent many years at Estes Industries introducing teachers to the potential of model rocketry as a teaching tool. Up to ten $500 grants are provided each year to teachers who use rocketry in their classrooms.

=== Extracurricular Activity Grant ===
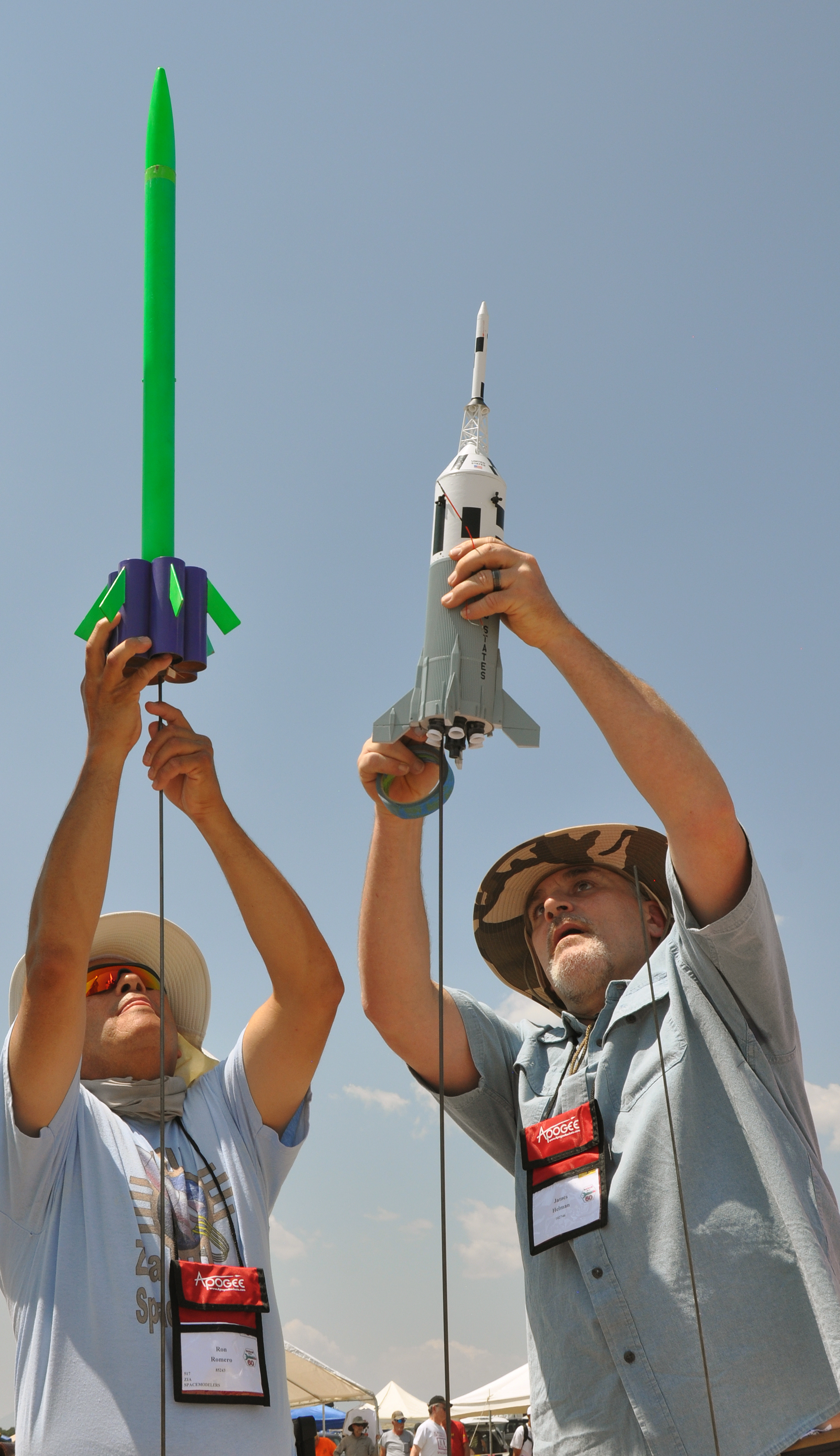
Rockets going on launch pad.

In 2015, the NAR instituted the Extracurricular Activity Grant (EAG) to provide up to ten $500 grants for after-school activities. An applicant must be a member or representative of an organization providing educational activities for children. (Examples include 4-H, Boy Scouts, Girl Scouts, Civil Air Patrol, Challenger Centers, and museums that provide extracurricular educational activities involving model rocketry.)

=== narTcert ===
The NAR Rocket Teacher Certification Program (narTcert) is a program to train teachers in the skills to build and fly model rockets and the confidence to lead a rocketry lesson in the classroom. NAR certified teachers are recognized as having been trained by NAR to be qualified to conduct launches, organize rocket programs with hands on STEM lessons for their school, and support the Team America Rocketry Challenge. Certification is open to NAR members who are professional classroom teachers, educators teaching after school programs, home school teachers, or informal educators with youth organizations.

=== Partnerships ===
In May 2007 the NAR and 4-H initiated a national partnership to encourage more youth to fly rockets, form rocket clubs and TARC teams, and more young people becoming scientists and engineers. The partnership has been very successful with a 4-H team from Georgetown, Texas winning first place at TARC and becoming the international champions in 2013.

The NAR and the Museum of Flight executed a Memorandum of Understanding in 2013 to develop a major sport rocketry exhibit and host the archival collections of G. Harry Stine and Vern and Gleda Estes, key figures in the history of the rocketry hobby. This is the first permanent exhibit exclusively for model rocketry in an American museum, and was dedicated on February 21, 2015.

The NAR and the Civil Air Patrol signed a Memorandum of Understanding in 2014 to become partners in educational rocketry. The two organizations are exploring ways to provide opportunities for youth and adults to initiate or increase their participation in model rocketry by collaborating on joint activities such as TARC, local rocket contests, science fairs, design challenges, space-related activities, sport launches and other related activities.

The NAR also provides mentoring, launch services, and technical support for NASA's Student Launch program, which culminates in a launch of experimental payloads on high-power rockets near Marshall Space Flight Center in Huntsville, Alabama each April.

== High Power Rocketry Certification ==
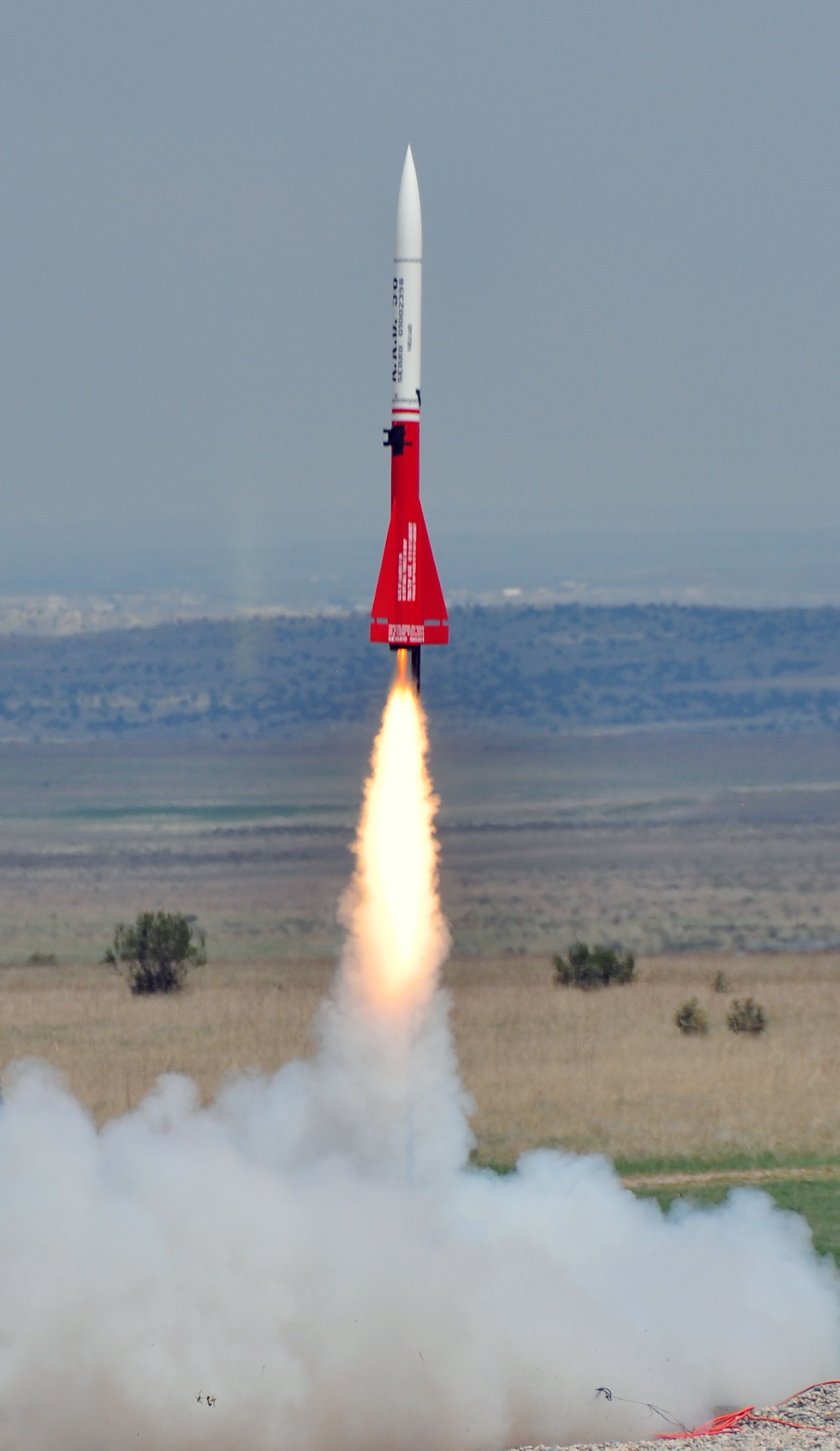
High-power rocket liftoff.

Any model rocket using a single motor greater than 160 Newton-seconds of total impulse, or multiple motors with a total thrust of 320 Newton-seconds, is propelled by a combination of motors having a total of more than 125 grams (4.4 oz) of propellant weight, or weighs more than 1,500 grams (53 ounces) with motors installed, is classified as a high-power rocket under National Fire Protection Association Standard 1127.

The NAR offers a three tier certification program for adult members who wish to build and fly High Power rockets (HPR), as well as a Junior HPR program for NAR members aged 14 through 17.

=== Level 1 ===
HPR Level 1 Certification allows the purchase and use of H and I impulse class motors, both solid and hybrid. In addition, certain F and G motors also require Level 1 certification for purchase and use, including hybrid motors, motors designed to emit sparks, and motors that exceed 80 Newtons average thrust, contain 125 or more grams of propellant, or are in rockets weighing more than 1500 grams.

An individual seeking Level 1 certification must be a minimum of 18 years old at the time of certification and a member in good standing of the NAR. The member attempting certification must build a rocket containing at least one H or I-class motor. The individual must fly the rocket successfully in the presence of a certification team, who evaluate the rocket's flight for stability, deployment of the recovery system, and safe recovery.

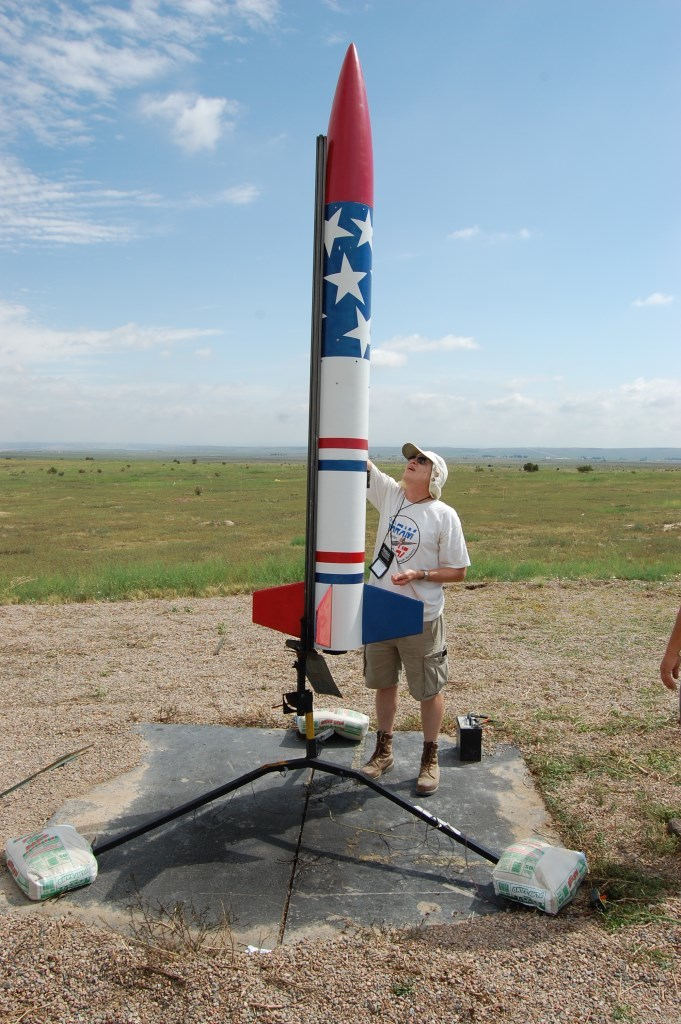
Final launch preparation for a Level-3 high-power rocket

==== Junior Level 1 ====
NAR members aged 14 through 17 may earn Junior Level 1 certification by successfully building and flying a high-power rocket with an H or I class motor. The principal restriction on Junior Level 1 rocketeers is that an adult must handle, prepare, and install all high-power motors.

=== Level 2 ===
Level 2 certification allows an individual to purchase and fly J, K, and L class motors. In addition to current NAR membership and Level 1 certification, a rocketeer attempting Level 2 certification must pass a written exam, build the rocket they wish to use for the certification attempt, and successfully fly the rocket with a J, K, or L class motor in the presence of a certification team.

=== Level 3 ===
Level 3 certification allows the NAR member to purchase and fly M, N, and O class high-power motors. The applicant must submit detailed plans for approval before beginning construction of the rocket, employ electronic deployment of the recovery system (normally a drogue parachute at maximum altitude followed by a main parachute a few hundred feet above the ground), and successfully fly the rocket in the presence of the certification team.

== National events ==
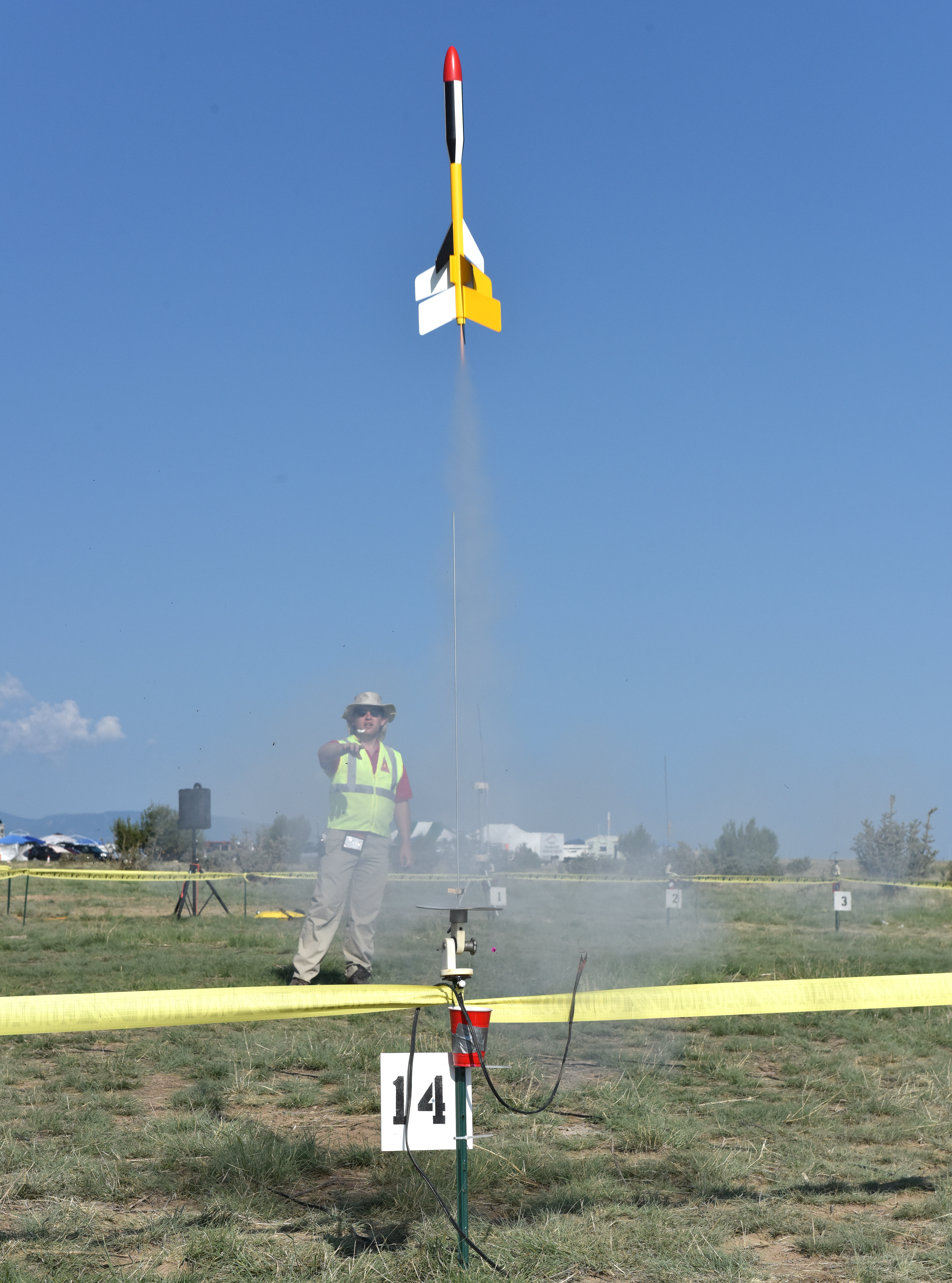
Launch of a Farside-X at NARAM 60.

=== NARCON ===
The NAR's National Convention (NARCON) is usually held during the late winter. The three-day event includes technical presentations, guest speakers, and a Saturday night banquet, and is often held at a historic destination such as Cape Canaveral or the Museum of Flight.

=== National Sport Launch ===
The National Sport Launch (NSL) is a large, non-competitive ("sport") launch, normally held over Memorial Day weekend. NSL attracts hundreds of participants of all ages, who fly rockets of all sizes and motor classes. Certification teams are usually available for rocketeers wishing to attempt high-power certification.

=== NARAM ===
The National Association of Rocketry Annual Meet (NARAM) is the NAR's annual model rocketry championship. NARAM is normally held during late July or early August at a site large enough for simultaneous competition, sport, and high-power rocket flights.

The first NARAM was held in 1959, two years after the NAR was formed. Historically, NARAM was rooted in competition and determining national champions. Today, NARAM may include an FAI Spacemodeling Team flyoff (meant to select a team of competitors who represent the US at a world level competition); a sport flying range featuring model and high-power rockets, an auction to support scholarship and education funds, research and development presentations, and a closing banquet where performance awards are given out. The competition component at NARAM is now the culmination of a preseason of flying under the National Rocketry Competition (NRC)- a new competition format that is simpler, less expensive, and designed to allow young members easier access to the joys of competition.

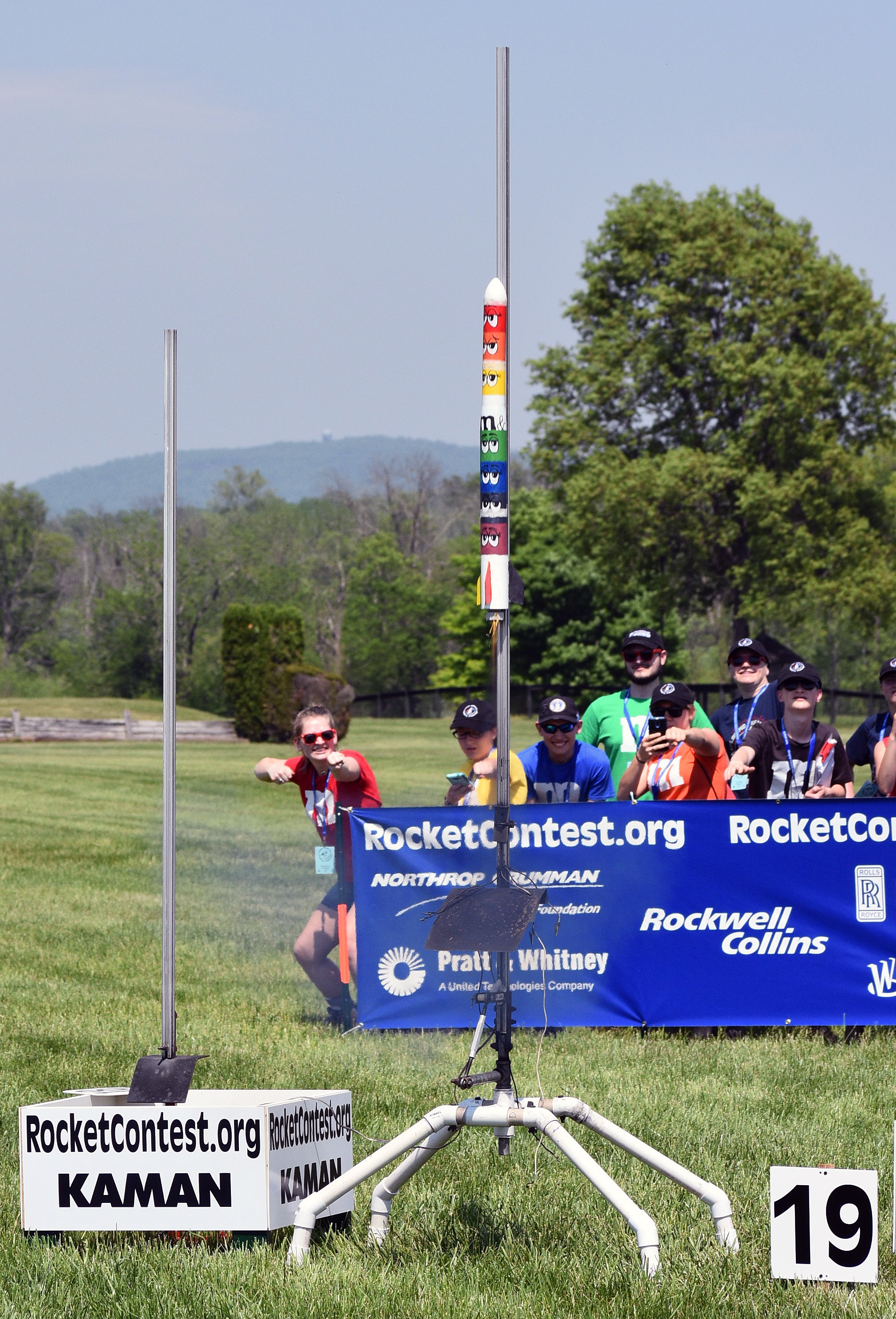
A Team America Rocket Challenge team prepares for their rocket to lift off during the 2018 TARC finals.

=== The America Rocketry Challenge ===
NAR co-sponsors The America Rocketry Challenge (TARC) with the Aerospace Industries Association. TARC is a national rocketry competition for students in 7th through 12th grades that culminates in a National Finals contest for the top 100 teams each May. While the specific challenge for TARC varies from year to year, the event always involves flying one or more raw eggs to a specified altitude and a specified flight duration, without damaging the egg.

Competition

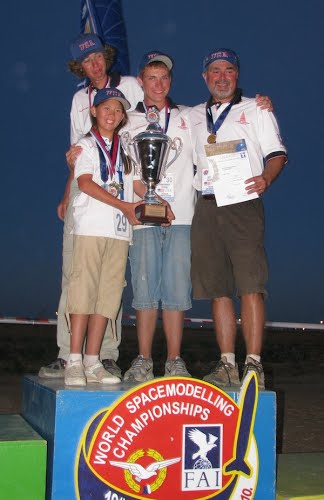
Members of the U.S. team on the winner's stand at the World Spacemodeling Championships, Serbia, August 2010

Prior to July 1, 2017, NAR sections (local groups of members) across the country would hold contests known as “meets” over the course of a “contest year” which runs July 1 to June 30 and includes a NARAM held shortly thereafter. There were four levels of meets- Section, Local, Open, and Regional. Each had different requirements on the minimum number of competitors and the geographic distribution of those competitors. Competitors attending these contests did so in the interest of earning “points” which they would accumulate during the course of the contest year which ended on June 30. Once the contest year ended, NARAM would be held and those competitors who could attend, would carry their accumulated point over to NARAM where they could earn more points. At an awards banquet that concluded NARAM, those competitors with the most points in each of four competition divisions, would receive awards for event performance (such as parachute duration) and National Champions (those with the greatest point totals) would be crowned. On July 1, 2017, after nearly 3 years of development, and in response to a steadily falling number of members involved in competition, a new US Model Rocket sporting Code (USMRSC) was implemented. The new Sporting Code described an entirely new competition format- the National Rocketry Competition or NRC. The intent of the NRC being to make contest rocketry more approachable, less expensive, and allow young members easier access to competition. The previous points structure was removed. Rules were created that allow members to fly competition as frequently as they want, wherever they can, with as few as just two members. NARAM 60 in 2018 was the culmination of the first year of competition under the NRC.

Any NAR member may participate in sanctioned competition. Most competition events fall into one of three categories:

- Altitude events - Modelers compete to achieve either the maximum altitude or an altitude specified by the contest director.
- Duration events - Modelers compete to achieve either the maximum flight duration or a duration specified by the contest director.
- Craftsmanship events - Modelers build and fly accurate replicas of actual or planned full-size rockets.

=== United States Model Rocket Sporting Code - USMRSC ===
Model rocket competition in the United States is governed by the United States Model Rocketry Sporting Code (USMRSC), also known as the "Sporting Code." An annual rules change process (RCP) permits NAR members to propose improvements and corrections to the Sporting Code. Any member may submit a proposal, which is posted online for a public comment period. Following the comment period, the authors of the proposals have one opportunity to adjust their RCP based on member feedback. The RCP process concludes with a member vote on the proposals. Those RCP's that pass get added to the Sporting Code in time for the next competition year.

=== International competition ===
The World Championships for Spacemodels has been held by the Fédération Aéronautique Internationale (FAI) about every two years since 1972, usually in late summer. The U.S. Team for a World Championships is selected by a flyoff process that is held at the opening weekend of NARAM one year prior to the event. The flyoff is open to all U.S. NAR members.

The National Association of Rocketry has hosted the FAI World Championships for Spacemodels in the United States three times.

- 1980: Lakehurst, New Jersey
- 1992: Melbourne, Florida
- 2023: Austin, Texas

== Publications ==
=== Sport Rocketry ===
Sport Rocketry is the official journal of the National Association of Rocketry. Sport Rocketry is the longest continually published magazine devoted to the sport rocket hobby. It is published bi-monthly and features regional launch coverage, construction and technical articles, rocket plans, scale data, competition tips, and product reviews.

=== The Electronic Rocketeer ===
The Electronic Rocketeer is a monthly online publication edited by the NAR president. A typical issue may include breaking news, a safety note, and links to popular pages on the NAR's website.

=== The Model Rocketeer ===
The Model Rocketeer is a 6-10 page newsletter published in the spring of each year. It contains a brief article from the NAR president, biographies of the year's candidates for the board of trustees, and a mail-in ballot for the Trustee Election.

=== Member Guidebook ===
The NAR Member Guidebook is sent to everyone who joins the NAR or renews their membership. It contains technical tips for beginning, intermediate, and advanced rocketeers, as well as an introduction to NAR's insurance policy and member services. It is updated every two years.

=== Educator's Newsletter ===
The Educator's Newsletter is a bi-monthly electronic publication for K-12 teachers. Topics include curriculum suggestions, aerospace history, TARC guidance, and other rocketry-related information of interest to the classroom teacher.

== NARTS ==
NAR Technical Services, known as NARTS, offers rocketry-related items that are difficult to find or exclusive to the NAR. NARTS offerings include technical publications, NAR-themed clothing, and supplies for running competition meets.

== NARTREK ==
The National Association of Rocketry Training Rocketeers for Experience and Knowledge (NARTREK) is a skill development program consisting of a series of achievement levels in rocketry. NARTREK has three basic achievement levels (Bronze, Silver, Gold), with numerous follow-on specialty levels. NARTREK is designed to help a rocketeer progress from basic skills to the ability to design a rocket and accurately predict its performance.

=== NARTREK Cadet program ===
The NARTREK Cadet differs from the standard NARTREK Program in that it is designed specifically for modelers under age 18, and it is open to both members and non-members of the NAR. NARTREK Cadet consists of a series of four achievement levels in rocketry, each requiring more skill to complete than the previous one.

== Standards and testing ==
State and federal law require all rocket motors to be independently tested before they may be sold in the United States. The NAR Standards and Testing Committee (“S&T”) performs this quality assurance for every individual rocket motor type and classification available to general consumers at its East Coast testing facilities at the Massachusetts Institute of Technology and its West Coast testing facilities in Hillsboro, Oregon.

S&T also re-tests each approved motor type every five years to ensure repeatability and help identify creeping degradation in manufacturing or distribution practices. In addition, S&T collects and reduces data from motor malfunction reports sent in by consumers, using this data to trigger special testing of questionable motors and production lots.

== Liability insurance ==
NAR membership includes general liability coverage as a membership benefit. This coverage is intended to help protect NAR members from liabilities arising out of NAR sport rocketry activities, including both model and high-power rockets. The policy limit is currently $5,000,000 per occurrence, with a $5,000 deductible per bodily injury and property damage claim.

== Advocacy ==
The NAR (along with the Tripoli Rocketry Association, the other major governing body in hobby rocketry) was involved in a nine-year lawsuit against the BATFE regarding the status of Ammonium Perchlorate Composite Propellant (APCP), the most common composite propellant used in hobby rocketry, as an explosive. The NAR and TRA won the lawsuit in 2009, deregulating APCP.

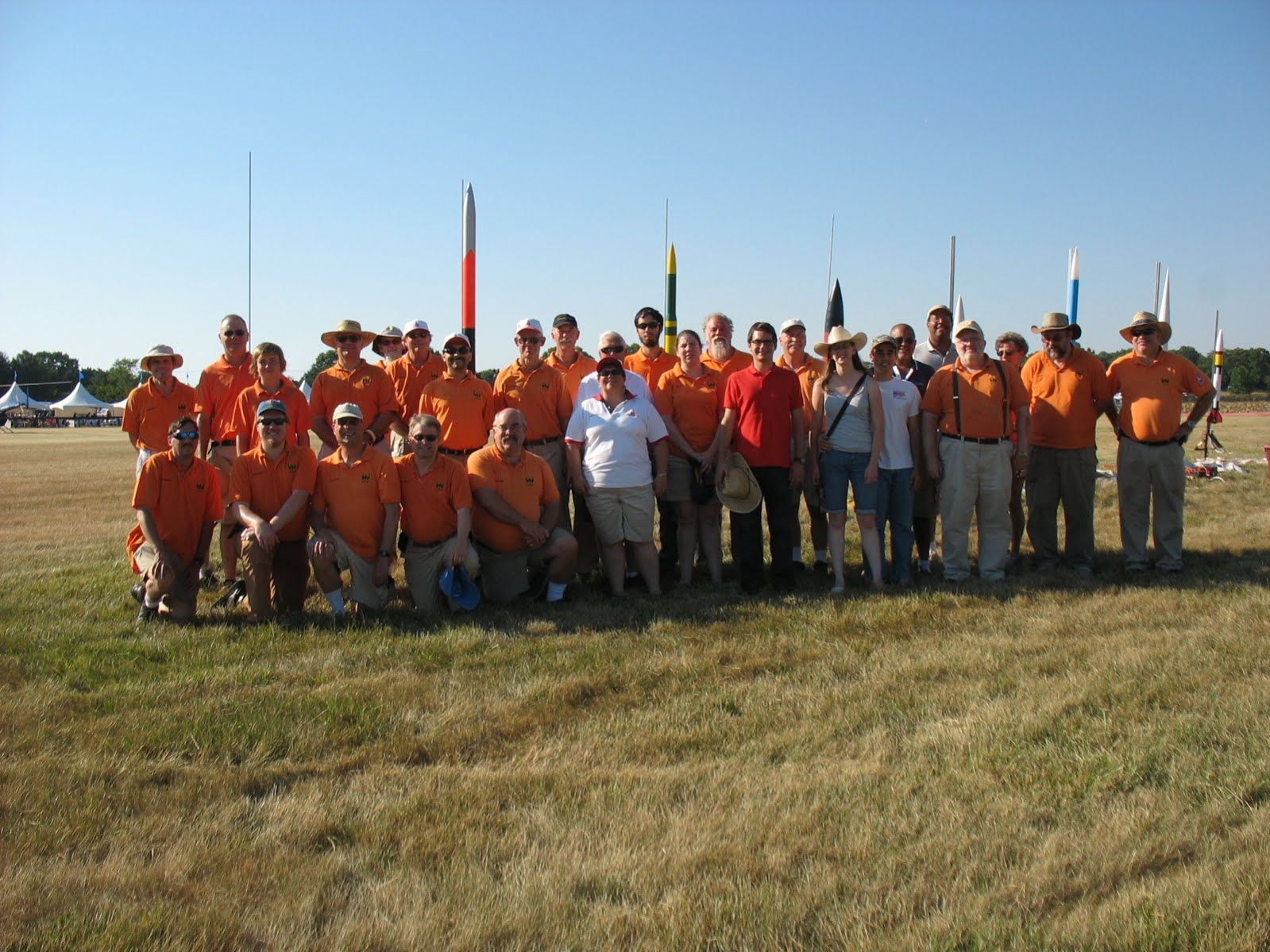
A National Association of Rocketry Section (local club)

== See also ==
- Bureau of Alcohol, Tobacco, Firearms and Explosives
