= Canadian Association of Rocketry =

The Canadian Association of Rocketry - L'Association Canadienne De Fuséologie (CAR-ACF) is a Canadian federal not for profit self-supporting association and governing body representing amateur/model rocketeers across Canada. The history of amateur/ model rocketry in Canada goes back to 1965 with its approval by the Canadian Federal government with the assistance of the Canadian Aeronautics and Space Institute (CASI), the Royal Canadian Flying Clubs (RCFCA), the new Canadian Association of Rocketry (CAR), and then with the help of the Youth Aeronautic and Aerospace of Canada (YAAC). CAR-ACF was incorporated in 2009 from the then existing Canadian Association of Rocketry - CAR.

Among its many duties, CAR-ACF is:

- to promote development of Amateur Aerospace as a recognized sport and worthwhile amateur activity.
- the official national body for amateur aerospace in Canada.
- a chartering organization for model rocket clubs across the country.
- offers its chartered clubs contest sanction and assistance in getting and keeping flying sites.
- the voice of its membership, providing liaison and certification programs with Transport Canada, Natural Resources Canada (Explosives Regulatory Division), and other government agencies
- also works with local governments, zoning boards and parks departments to promote the interests of local chartered clubs.
- CAR-ACF is the principal stakeholder representing Non-military, Non-commercial aerospace on the Transport Canada Canadian Aviation Regulatory Advisory Council (CARAC) which is responsible for maintaining and developing the Canadian Aviation Regulations (CARS).
- a Rocketry Association whose rules and regulations as formally acceptable to the Minister of Transport.
