= CO2 rocket =

Small recreational rocket that uses carbon dioxide as a propellant

A carbon dioxide rocket (CO_{2} rocket) is a type of rocket that uses carbon dioxide as a propellant. It should be fired outdoors.

Carbon dioxide rocket (slurry, hybrid, etc.) can be used in model rocketry, where it is also known as a pop rocket. Its engine could generate a specific impulse of around 280 seconds.

== See also ==
- Water rocket
