= Quest Aerospace =

American manufacturer

Quest Aerospace is a company based in Cedar City, UT, United States, that designs and produces model rocket kits.

Quest Aerospace was founded in 1992 by Bill Stine (son of G. Harry Stine) in Pagosa Springs, Colorado, and produces model rocket kits for various skill levels of modelers, from the beginner to the most highly skilled. In 1995, ToyBiz (now Marvel Entertainment) acquired Quest along with Spectra Star, Inc. In 2003, Bill Stine purchased back Quest Aerospace from Marvel. In 2014, Quest Aerospace was purchased by RCS rocket motor components (Aerotech Consumer Aerospace) and was moved from Pagosa Springs, CO to Cedar City, Utah.

Quest's products include model rockets powered by standard 18 mm motors. After Aerotech acquired the company, it slowly started phasing out the black powder and MicroMaxx motors. The company is now currently producing the ammonium perchlorate Q-Jet motors, available for purchase now.

In early 2018, Quest Aerospace announced some of their Q-Jet rocket motors, A3's, and B4s, made of ammonium perchlorate. These motors are now available on Quest Aerospace's website.

== In popular culture ==
The name Quest Aerospace was used in the 2002 film Spider-Man, based on the Marvel Comics character of the same name. Quest was a competitor of Oscorp, the company owned by Norman Osborn (a.k.a. the Green Goblin). Quest was competing with Oscorp to sell an exoskeleton to the US Military, and after the Green Goblin destroyed it, the company restructured and was going to purchase Oscorp before the Goblin killed the Oscorp board of directors.
