= Ejection charge =

Pyrotechnic composition

Ejection charge (commonly Black Powder), also called expelling charge, is a pyrotechnic composition, a type of a pyrotechnic gas generator designed to produce a small short-term amount of thrust to burst open a container and eject its content.

In model rocketry, ejection charges are used to deploy a recovery system (usually parachute or streamer). The ejection charge is ignited through a layer of delay composition, to fire shortly after the main engine burns out. Ejection charges can be also triggered by a timer or an altimeter. A small amount of black powder is usually used, but smokeless powder and other compositions are possible. Ejection charge is granular black powder.

Ejection charges are also used in some flares to eject the light or smoke producing components out of the flare casing. In countermeasure flares, ejection charges are used to propel the flares out of their casing, or to eject pyrophoric fluids from their containers.

In cluster bombs, ejection charges are used to disperse the submunitions. Burst charges are also used to dispense leaflets from leaflet bombs. In chemical weapons, ejection charges are used to disperse the chemical agent from the bomb, submunition, grenade, or warhead.

== See also ==
- Burst charge
