= Vernon Estes =

American businessman

Vernon "Vern" Estes (born January 4, 1930) is the founder of Estes Industries, the highly recognized model rocket production company, headquartered in Penrose, Colorado.

In 1957, G. Harry Stine and Orville Carlisle founded the first model rocket company, Model Missiles Incorporated, in Denver, Colorado. By 1959, the demand for rocket engines was too great for their production capabilities, so they sought out an external supplier. The Estes family business was the first fireworks company listed in the Denver phone book.

Their son, Vern, took it upon himself to find a way to mechanize the production of model rocket engines. He assembled a machine which he named "Mabel," capable of producing a rocket engine every 5.5 seconds. The machine was powered by compressed air and hydraulics, which reduced the chances of accidental fire or explosion common in machines using electrical controls which could produce sparks.

Subsequently Model Missiles, Inc. closed due to a series of unsuccessful business decisions. Although a model rocketry supplier had disappeared, the market still existed, due to public interest in the burgeoning Space Race.

As a result, Estes formed his own company, Estes Industries, to address this market.

His first rocket kit was the Astron Scout, a simple design that was so small it would fit inside the cardboard tubes used for shipping rocket engines.

In succeeding years, Estes Industries greatly expanded its product line of rocket kits, offering more than 50 by the end of the decade.

In 1961, Estes moved his company to a 77-acre (310,000 m^{2}) facility near Penrose, Colorado. Although he sold his interest in Estes Industries in 1969, he remains active in model rocketry and occasionally attends launch events.

He also helped start the National Association of Rocketry, and also helped create the Model Rocket Safety Code.
