= Estes Industries =

Functional model rocket company

Estes Rockets
- Type: Private
- Predecessor: Estes Industries, Estes-Cox Corp.
- Founded: Denver, Colorado, U.S. (1958)
- Founder: Vernon Estes
- Headquarters: Penrose, Colorado
- Key people: Ellis Langford; Mallory Langford; John Langford (engineer)
- Products: Model rockets and Model aircraft
- Owner: Estes Industries, LLC.
- Divisions: Estes Energetics
- Website: estesrockets.com

Estes Industries is a model rocket company that was started in Denver, Colorado, USA.

== History ==
Estes Industries was founded by Vernon Estes in 1958; in 1961, the company moved to a 77-acre tract of land on the outskirts of Penrose, Colorado. In 1969, Vernon sold the company to the Damon Corporation of Needham, Massachusetts, a company which also purchased a number of other hobby companies including a smaller competitor of Estes, Centuri Engineering of Phoenix, Arizona. Damon merged the two companies under the name Centuri Engineering. The Penrose entity continued doing business as Estes Industries. Centuri Engineering model rocket products continued to be developed, marketed and sold from the Centuri offices in Phoenix as well, although the actual manufacturing of Centuri products was soon moved to the Estes facility in Penrose. Sales of Centuri model rocket products were never as successful as Estes brand products and the Centuri Engineering offices in Phoenix were finally closed and the Centuri product line was discontinued in 1983.

Following a hostile takeover of the Damon Corporation in 1989, Estes Industries was divested and became part of Hobby Products. The business name of the company was shortened to Centuri Corporation. In 1996, Hobby Products acquired the assets of Cox Products of Corona, California, a company involved with the design and manufacture of model airplanes and glow-fuel model airplane engines. Cox's assets were moved to the Estes facility. In 2002, the combined company was sold again and the company's name was changed to Estes-Cox Corp.

On August 30, 2002, Barry Tunick, who had been the chief executive officer since 1991, acquired Estes-Cox Corporation from the private equity fund, TCW Capital, for $15 million. On January 15, 2010, Estes-Cox was acquired by Hobbico, Inc. On January 10, 2018, Hobbico filed for bankruptcy protection under the auspices of the United States Bankruptcy Court in Delaware. As a result of the bankruptcy, Estes-Cox was sold to Estes Industries LLC on April 12, 2018.

== Accomplishments ==
=== Indoor launch of model rockets in Astrodome ===
Along with several smaller rockets, Estes sponsored an indoor launch of a model of a Saturn V at halftime of the Bluebonnet Bowl in the Houston Astrodome on December 31, 1969.

== Estes rockets ==
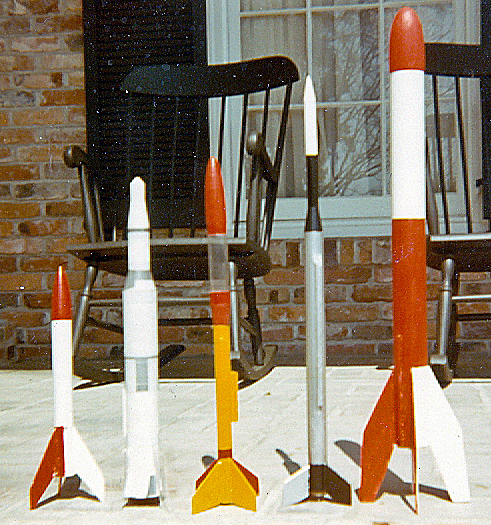
Five rockets from Estes in 1969: the Alpha, Saturn V (Semi Scale), X-ray, Aerobee 300, and Astron Ranger

Estes produced a wide variety of rocket model kits, normally using paperboard tubing for the fuselage and balsa wood for fins and nose cones. Early models tended to be relatively simple in design, differing in size, number of stages and recovery method. The first kit Estes offered was the Astron Scout (Rocket Kit K-1) which sold for $ 0.70. It was followed by the Astron Mark (K-2) and the Astron Space Plane (K-3). A more advanced rocket, the Astron X-Ray, featured a see-through plastic payload compartment. Another particularly well-known design from this era was the Camroc, a small camera that replaced the nose cone of larger models that was designed to take a single image on a small disk of film when the motor had burned out and the rocket was facing downward. The Cineroc used a small movie camera that could be launched from larger rockets, taking a series of frames as the rocket ascended. In the 1960s, Estes featured scale models patterned after the popular NASA designs such as the Gemini-Titan and Saturn-V crewed rockets.

Later model kits from the late 1970s and early 1980s tended to be more for show than performance, including a series of scale or sport-scale designs and "exotics". The 1981 Estes catalog featured a replica of the Space Shuttle. Centuri was also well known for these sorts of designs, and the two companies often copied design elements from the other's latest models. The downturn in the hobby in the later 1980s led to consolidation of the two companies. During the 1990s the model line was dramatically reduced, and the ones that were left were typically very simple "three fins and a nose cone" designs that were partially or entirely preassembled.

By 2019, Estes was offering a much wider range of rockets for sale, including models as complex as the Saturn V.

== Estes rocket engines ==
=== Estes rocket engine color-coding ===
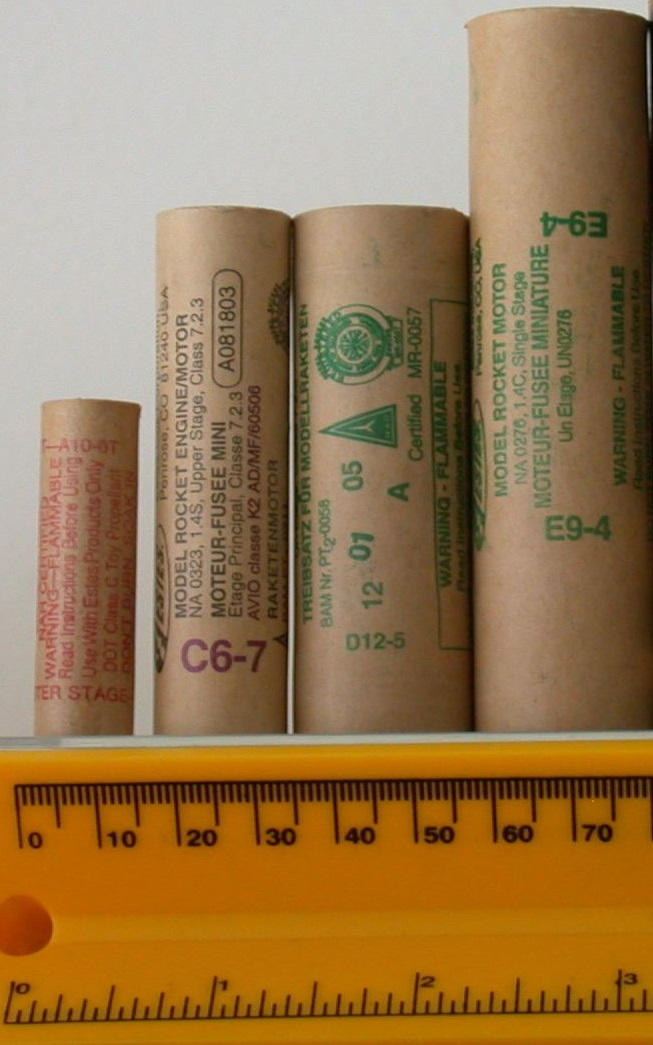
Estes Rocket motors. From left, 13mm A10-0T, 18mm C6-7, 24mm D12-5, 24mm E9-4

Estes engines are color-coded for recommended use.

- Green engines are for use in single-stage models.
- Purple engines for the top stages of multistage rockets and very light single-stage rockets; they have the longest delay times.
- Red engines for all booster and intermediate stages of multi-stage models.
- Black (current) and blue (older) engines are "plugged" and are used for rocket-powered racers, aerobrake recovery rockets, simulated strap-on boosters, and radio controlled gliders; they contain no delay or ejection charge. Black was also used in the past for static test engines.

It can be dangerous to use upper-stage engines in normal single-stage rockets. The long delay in ejection can be problematic. The rocket may already be halfway through its descent when the parachute or streamer is ejected, and the rocket may not slow down enough before it hits the ground.

=== Estes number coding ===
Each rocket engine has a code printed upon the outer jacket. This code is defined by the National Association of Rocketry (NAR). An example of one such code is A8-3.

Type	Total Impulse (Newton seconds)
1/4A	0.31–0.62
1/2A	0.63–1.25
A	1.26–2.50
B	2.51–5.00
C	5.01–10.00
D	10.01–20.00
E	20.01–40.00
F	40.01–80.00
G	80.01–160.00

The capital letter (e.g., A) indicates total impulse produced by the engine. Each succeeding letter represents a power range with maximum total impulse twice the impulse of the previous letter. (Example: A single C engine can produce anywhere from 5.01 to 10 newton-seconds of impulse, a G engine 80.1 to 160 newton-seconds.) Model rockets are considered using motors up to a D engine. Mid-power rockets use engines from E to G. Anything over a G engine is considered high power rocketry.

The first number (e.g., 8) specifies that engine's average thrust in newtons or the average push exerted by the engine. Thus a B6-0 and a C6-0 will both produce the same average thrust of 6 newtons, but the C6-0, having twice the total impulse, will fire for twice as long. The rocket engines produce maximum thrust shortly after ignition and thrust declines to a steady-state which is maintained for up to 2.5 seconds prior to burnout.

The final number (e.g., 3) indicates the delay between the thrust and the ejection charge, in seconds. Engines with a delay of zero are typically used as booster engines in multi-stage rockets and there is no ejection charge. In this case, the burning propellant ruptures through the top and hot bits of propellant enter the nozzle of the upper stage engine, thus igniting that engine and forcing the booster assembly away, hopefully to tumble safely to earth.

=== Estes engine construction ===
Estes produces single-use engines with compressed black powder propellant. They come in industry-standard sizes of 13mm (1/4A through A), 18mm (1/2A through C), 24mm (C through E), and 29mm (E and F) in diameter. The engines are constructed within a sturdy cardboard tube. Inside are placed a clay nozzle, solid propellant, delay charge, ejection charge, and a clay retainer cap.

The solid propellant is ignited by a coated wire inserted through the nozzle and in contact with the propellant. An electric current heats the wire and ignites the solid propellant. An engine can also be ignited by the hot gases from the propellant of a booster engine.

From 2013 to 2018, Estes carried certain AeroTech E, F and G impulse 29mm single-use APCP (ammonium-perchlorate composite propellant) motors relabeled as Estes Pro Series II for their new, larger rockets of the same name. One feature of these motors is rear retention, which is the addition of a molded-in thrust ring at the base of the motor body on the aft (nozzle) end. This made Estes include a new style of screw-on retaining rings with the Pro Series II kits to accommodate rear retention. However, once the AeroTech motors were discontinued, Estes 29mm black powder motors need a ring of thin tape, about 1/4" in width, around the paper motor case on the nozzle end to simulate the AeroTech aft thrust ring. Even now, some currently-produced kits include screw-on 24mm and 29mm motor retainers, and thus require the tape ring.

==== Mabel ====
Vern Estes created "Mabel", a machine designed to safely and inexpensively manufacture model rocket engines for Model Missiles Incorporated. Primarily using compressed air for machine operations, it effectively eliminated the risk of electrical sparks inadvertently igniting rocket propellant. Mabel was capable of producing a completed model rocket engine every 5-1/2 seconds.

The operation began with an engine casing tube being loaded onto a rotating table. The table then advanced through multiple stations where the nozzle, propellant, delay and ejection components were added. A paper end cap was then cut from a roll of heavy paper tape and inserted to retain the loose ejection charge. The completed engine was then ejected from the table, sent through the printer and dropped into the finished engine box below.

=== Engine Performance ===
Measurements reported by a group at the University of Central Arkansas found that Estes rocket motor models A3-4T, A8-3, B4-4, B6-4, C6-5, and D12-3 have a measured impulses from 15.4% to 22.8% below the claimed impulse. A study at the Australian Defence Force Academy found Estes D11-P motor to have an impulse 11.4% below Estes specifications and the C6-0 motor to be 4.45% below Estes' specifications. A third study found the A10-PT motor to have a total impulse 20% below Estes' claims. A research project conducted in 2000 by Ellis Langford (who later became president of Estes Industries, LLC) investigated the performance of black powder model rocket motors at higher altitudes. Langford's findings indicate that total impulse and average thrust increase significantly with increased elevation. Estes Industries claimed specifications are based on testing at the Penrose manufacturing plant at an altitude of approximately 5000 feet, versus the three studies and National Association of Rocketry certification tests, all of which were performed at altitudes much nearer sea level.

== Reception ==
Estes model rockets are popular and used by a large number of hobbyists and educators.
