= Newton-second =

SI derived unit of impulse

newton-second
- For objects moving with the same velocity (v), each object's momentum (p) is proportional to its mass (m).

General information
- Unit system: SI
- Unit of: impulse and momentum
- Symbol: N⋅s
- Named after: Isaac Newton
- In SI base units: kg⋅m/s

The newton-second (also newton second; symbol: N⋅s or N s) is the unit of impulse in the International System of Units (SI). It is dimensionally equivalent to the momentum unit kilogram-metre per second (kg⋅m/s). One newton-second corresponds to a one-newton force applied for one second. It can be used to identify the resultant velocity of a mass if a force accelerates the mass for a specific time interval:
$$\vec F \cdot t = \Delta m \vec v.$$

== Definition ==
Momentum is given by the formula
$$\mathbf{p} = m \mathbf{v},$$
where

- $\mathbf{p}$ is the momentum in newton-seconds (N⋅s) or "kilogram-metres per second" (kg⋅m/s),
- $m$ is the mass in kilograms (kg),
- $\mathbf{v}$ is the velocity in metres per second (m/s).

== Examples ==
This table gives the magnitudes of some momenta for various masses and speeds.

Mass (kg)	Speed (m/s)	Momentum (N⋅s)	Explanation
0.42	2.4	1	A 420-gram (15 oz) football (FIFA specified weight for outdoor size 5) kicked to a speed of 8.6 km/h (5.3 mph).
0.42	38	16	The momentum of the famous football kick of the Brazilian player Roberto Carlos in the match against France in 1997. The football had a speed of 137 km/h (85 mph), making it one of the hardest kicks measured.
1300	10	13000	A four-door car weighing 1300 kg (2900 lb) crashing at 36 km/h (22 mph).
2000	10	20000	A mid-size SUV weighing 2000 kg (4400 lb) crashing at 36 km/h (22 mph).
6	1	6	The total impulse of a class C model rocket engine, which can be found in amateur fireworks.
10	2	20	The total impulse of a class D model rocket engine, which also can be found in amateur fireworks.
132500	8050	1.07×10^{9}	Space Shuttle launched from Earth to orbit (Note: Space Shuttle weight here includes the heaviest possible payload (27500 kg), empty external tank (30000 kg), and the shuttle itself (75000 kg) all in a low Earth orbit (8.05 km/s). As the Space Shuttle uses staging, not all launched components reach all the way to orbit (e.g. the boosters). The total impulse gained by all stages together during the launch is 5.7×10^{9} Ns.)
45702	10834	4.95×10^{8}	Apollo 11 launched from Earth to orbit
0.0075	350	2.6	A 7.5-gram (0.26 oz) handgun bullet (e.g. 9mm Parabellum) fired at 350 m/s (1100 ft/s).
0.004	945	3.8	A 4-gram (0.14 oz) rifle bullet (e.g. 5.56×45mm NATO) fired at 945 m/s (3100 ft/s).
0.05	860	43	A 50-gram (1.8 oz) anti-material bullet (e.g. .50 BMG) fired at 860 m/s (2800 ft/s).

== See also ==
- Power factor
- Newton-metre – SI unit of torque
- Orders of magnitude (momentum) – examples of momenta
