= Ammonium perchlorate composite propellant =

Solid-rocket propellant

Ammonium perchlorate composite propellant (APCP) is a solid rocket propellant. It differs from many traditional solid rocket propellants such as black powder or zinc-sulfur, not only in chemical composition and overall performance but also by being cast into shape, as opposed to powder pressing as with black powder. This provides manufacturing regularity and repeatability, which are necessary requirements in the aerospace industry.

== Uses ==
Ammonium perchlorate composite propellant (APCP) is typically for aerospace rocket propulsion where simplicity and reliability are desired and specific impulses (depending on the composition and operating pressure) of 180–260 s (1.8–2.5 km/s) are adequate. Because of these performance attributes, APCP has been used in the Space Shuttle Solid Rocket Boosters, aircraft ejection seats, and specialty space exploration applications such as NASA's Mars Exploration Rover descent stage retrorockets. In addition, the high-power rocketry community regularly uses APCP in the form of commercially available propellant "reloads", as well as single-use motors. Experienced experimental and amateur rocketeers also often work with APCP, processing the APCP themselves.

== Composition ==
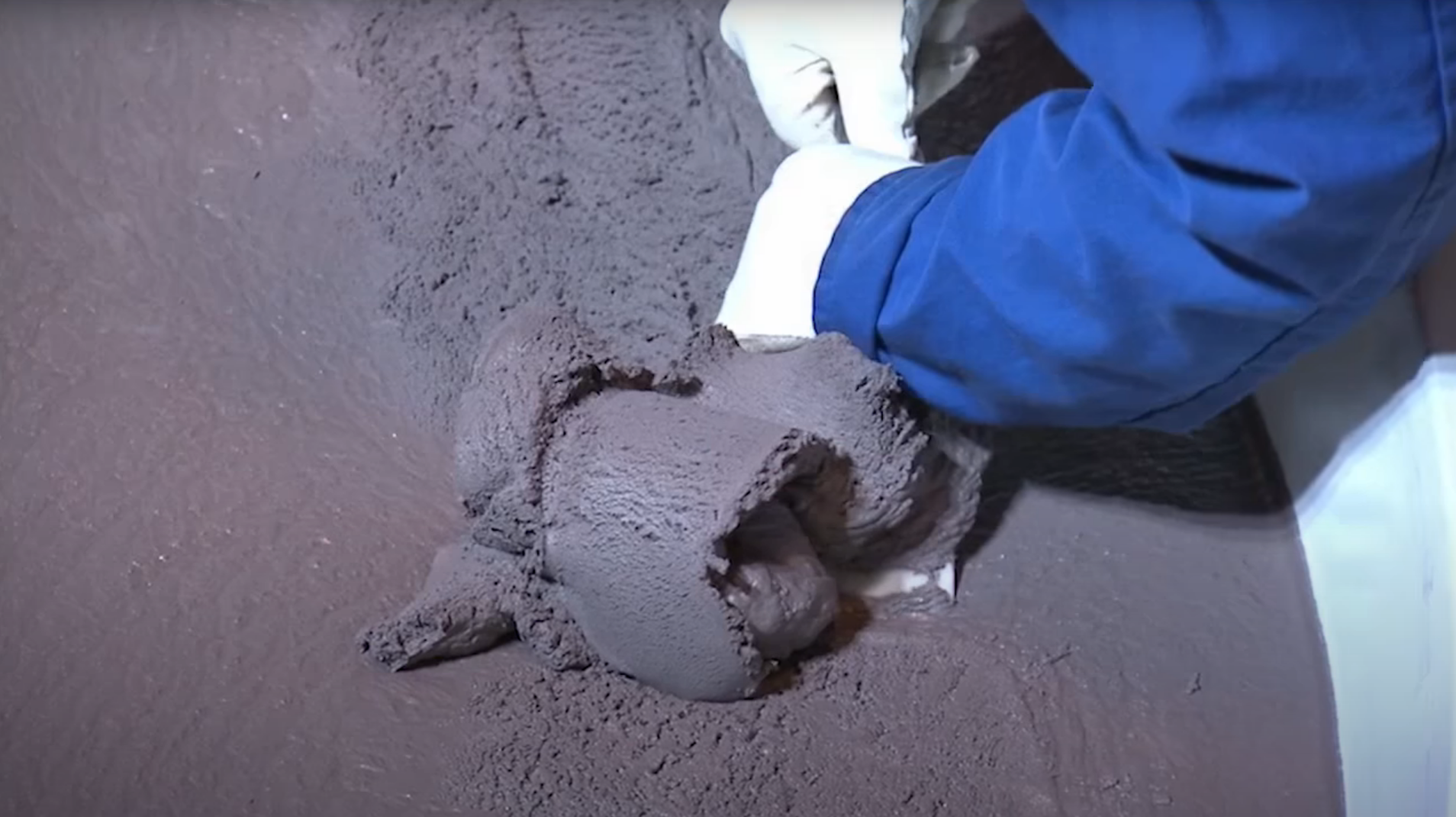
Uncured APCP for Space Launch System (SLS) solid rocket boosters

=== Overview ===
Ammonium perchlorate (AP) composite propellant is a composite propellant, meaning that it has both fuel and oxidizer combined into a homogeneous mixture, in this case with a rubbery binder as part of the fuel. The propellant is most often composed of ammonium perchlorate, an elastomer binder such as hydroxyl-terminated polybutadiene (HTPB) or polybutadiene acrylic acid acrylonitrile prepolymer (PBAN), powdered metal (typically aluminium), and various burn rate catalysts. In addition, curing additives induce elastomer binder cross-linking to solidify the propellant before use. The perchlorate serves as the oxidizer, while the binder and aluminium serve as the fuel. Burn rate catalysts determine how quickly the mixture burns. The resulting cured propellant is fairly elastic (rubbery), which also helps limit fracturing during accumulated damage (such as shipping, installing, cutting) and high acceleration applications such as rocketry. This includes the Space Shuttle missions, in which APCP was used for the two SRBs.

The composition of APCP can vary significantly depending on the application, intended burn characteristics, and constraints such as nozzle thermal limitations or specific impulse (I_{sp}). Rough mass proportions (in high-performance configurations) tend to be about 70/15/15 AP/HTPB/Al, though fairly high performance "low-smoke" can have compositions of roughly 80/18/2 AP/HTPB/Al. While metal fuel is not required in APCP, most formulations include at least a few percent as a combustion stabilizer, propellant opacifier (to limit excessive infrared propellant preheating), and increase the temperature of the combustion gases (increasing I_{sp}).

=== Common components ===
Oxidizers

- Ammonium perchlorate as the primary oxidizer
- Metal-oxide catalysts as thermite oxidizers

Catalysts

- Carborane
- Copper chromite
- Iron oxides
- Ferrocene and derivatives (catocene, butacene, etc)

High energy fuels

- Aluminium (high performance, most common)
- Magnesium (medium performance)
- Zinc (low performance)

Low energy fuels acting as binders

- Hydroxyl-terminated polybutadiene (HTPB)
- Carboxyl-terminated polybutadiene (CTPB)
- Polybutadiene acrylonitrile (PBAN)

=== Special considerations ===
Though increasing the ratio of metal-fuel to oxidizer up to the stoichiometric point increases the combustion temperature, the presence of an increasing molar fraction of metal oxides, particularly aluminium oxide (Al_{2}O_{3}) precipitating from the gaseous solution creates globules of solids or liquids that slow down the flow velocity as the mean molecular mass of the flow increases. In addition, the chemical composition of the gases changes, varying the effective heat capacity of the gas. Because of these phenomena, there exists an optimal non-stoichiometric composition for maximizing Isp of roughly 16% by mass, assuming the combustion reaction goes to completion inside the combustion chamber.

The combustion time of the aluminium particles in the hot combustion gas varies depending on aluminium particle size and shape. In small APCP motors with high aluminium content, the residence time of the combustion gases does not allow for full combustion of the aluminium, causing a substantial fraction of it to burn outside the combustion chamber and reducing performance. This effect is often mitigated by reducing aluminium particle size, inducing turbulence (extending characteristic path length and residence time), and/or reducing the aluminium content to increase net oxidizing potential, ensuring more complete aluminium combustion. Aluminium combustion inside the motor is the rate-limiting pathway since the liquid-aluminium droplets (even still liquid at temperatures 3,000 K (2,730 °C; 4,940 °F)) limit the reaction to a heterogeneous globule interface, making the surface area to volume ratio an important factor in determining the combustion residence time and required combustion chamber size/length.

=== Particle size ===
The propellant particle size distribution has a profound impact on APCP rocket motor performance. Smaller AP and Al particles lead to higher combustion efficiency but also lead to increased linear burn rate. The burn rate is heavily dependent on mean AP particle size as the AP absorbs heat to decompose into a gas before it can oxidize the fuel components. This process may be a rate-limiting step in the overall combustion rate of APCP. The phenomenon can be explained by considering the heat-flux-to-mass ratio: As the particle radius increases the volume (and, therefore, mass and heat capacity) increases as the cube of the radius. However, the surface area increases as the square of the radius, which is roughly proportional to the heat flux into the particle. Therefore, a particle's rate of temperature rise is maximized when the particle size is minimized.

Common APCP formulations call for 30–400 μm AP particles (often spherical), as well as 2–50 μm Al particles (often spherical). Because of the size discrepancy between the AP and Al, Al will often take an interstitial position in a pseudo-lattice of AP particles.

== Characteristics ==
=== Geometric ===
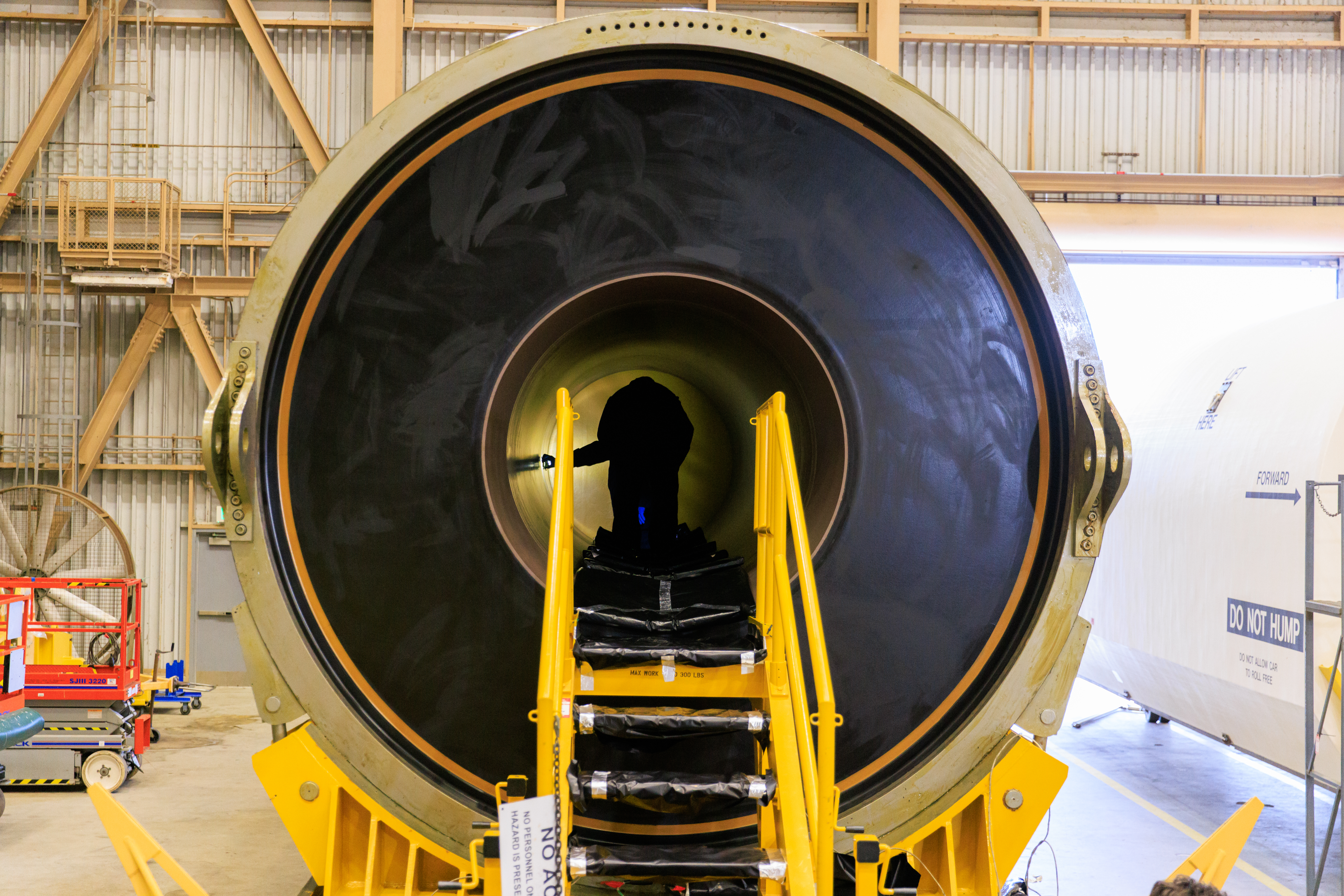
Cross section of Artemis II mission's solid rocket booster.

APCP deflagrates from the surface of exposed propellant in the combustion chamber. In this fashion, the geometry of the propellant inside the rocket motor plays an important role in the overall motor performance. As the surface of the propellant burns, the shape evolves (a subject of study in internal ballistics), most often changing the propellant surface area exposed to the combustion gases. The mass flux (kg/s) [and therefore pressure] of combustion gases generated is a function of the instantaneous surface area $A_\text{s}$ (m^{2}), propellant density $\rho$ (kg/m^{3}), and linear burn rate $b_r$ (m/s):

$$\dot{m} = \rho A_\text{s} b_r$$

Several geometric configurations are often used depending on the application and desired thrust curve:

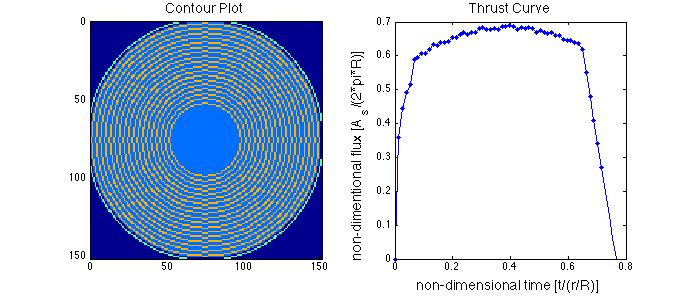
Circular bore simulation

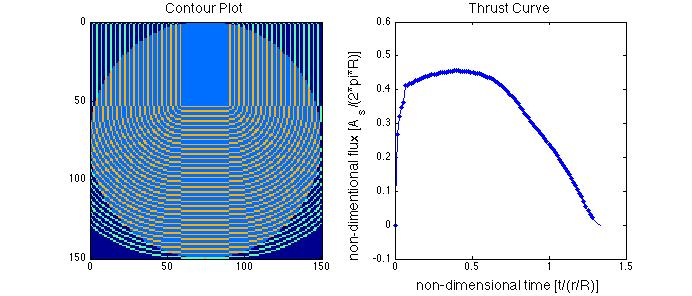
C-Slot simulation

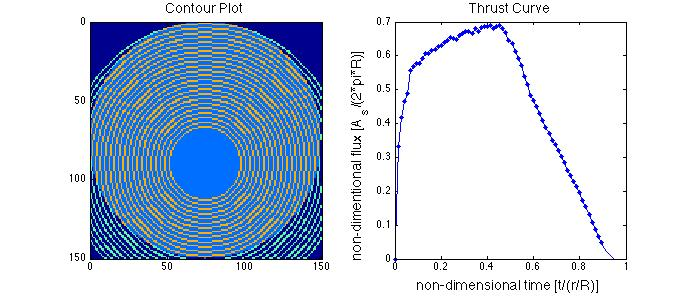
Moon burner simulation

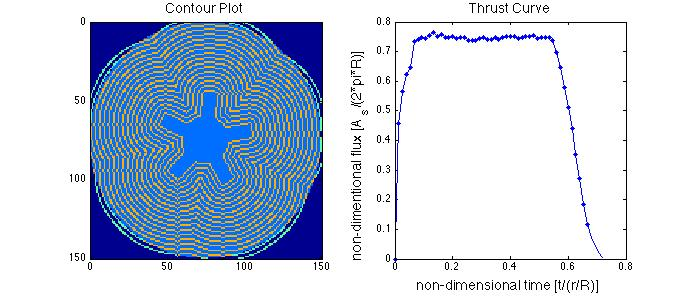
5-point finocyl simulation
- Circular bore: if in BATES configuration, produces progressive-regressive thrust curve.
- End burner: propellant burns from one axial end to another producing steady long burn, though has thermal difficulties, CG shift.
- C-slot: propellant with large wedge cut out of the side (along axial direction), producing fairly long regressive thrust, though has thermal difficulties and asymmetric CG characteristics.
- Moon burner: off-center circular bore produces progressive-regressive long burn though has slight asymmetric CG characteristics.
- Finocyl: usually a 5 or 6 legged star-like shape that can produce very level thrust, with a bit quicker burn than circular bore due to increased surface area.

=== Burn rate ===
While the surface area can be easily tailored by careful geometric design of the propellant, the burn rate is dependent on several subtle factors:

- Propellant chemical composition.
- AP, Al, additive particle sizes.
- Combustion pressure.
- Heat transfer characteristics.
- Erosive burning (high-velocity flow moving past the propellant).
- Initial temperature of propellant.

In summary, however, most formulations have a burn rate between 1–3 mm/s at STP and 6–12 mm/s at 68 atm. The burn characteristics (such as linear burn rate) are often determined prior to rocket motor firing using a strand burner test. This test allows the APCP manufacturer to characterize the burn rate as a function of pressure. Empirically, APCP adheres fairly well to the following power-function model:

$$b_r = a p^n$$

It is worth noting that typically for APCP, n is 0.3–0.5 indicating that APCP is sub-critically pressure sensitive. That is, if surface area were maintained constant during a burn the combustion reaction would not run away to (theoretically) infinite as the pressure would reach an internal equilibrium. This isn't to say that APCP cannot cause an explosion, just that it will not detonate. Thus, any explosion would be caused by the pressure surpassing the burst pressure of the container (rocket motor).

== Model/high-power rocketry applications ==
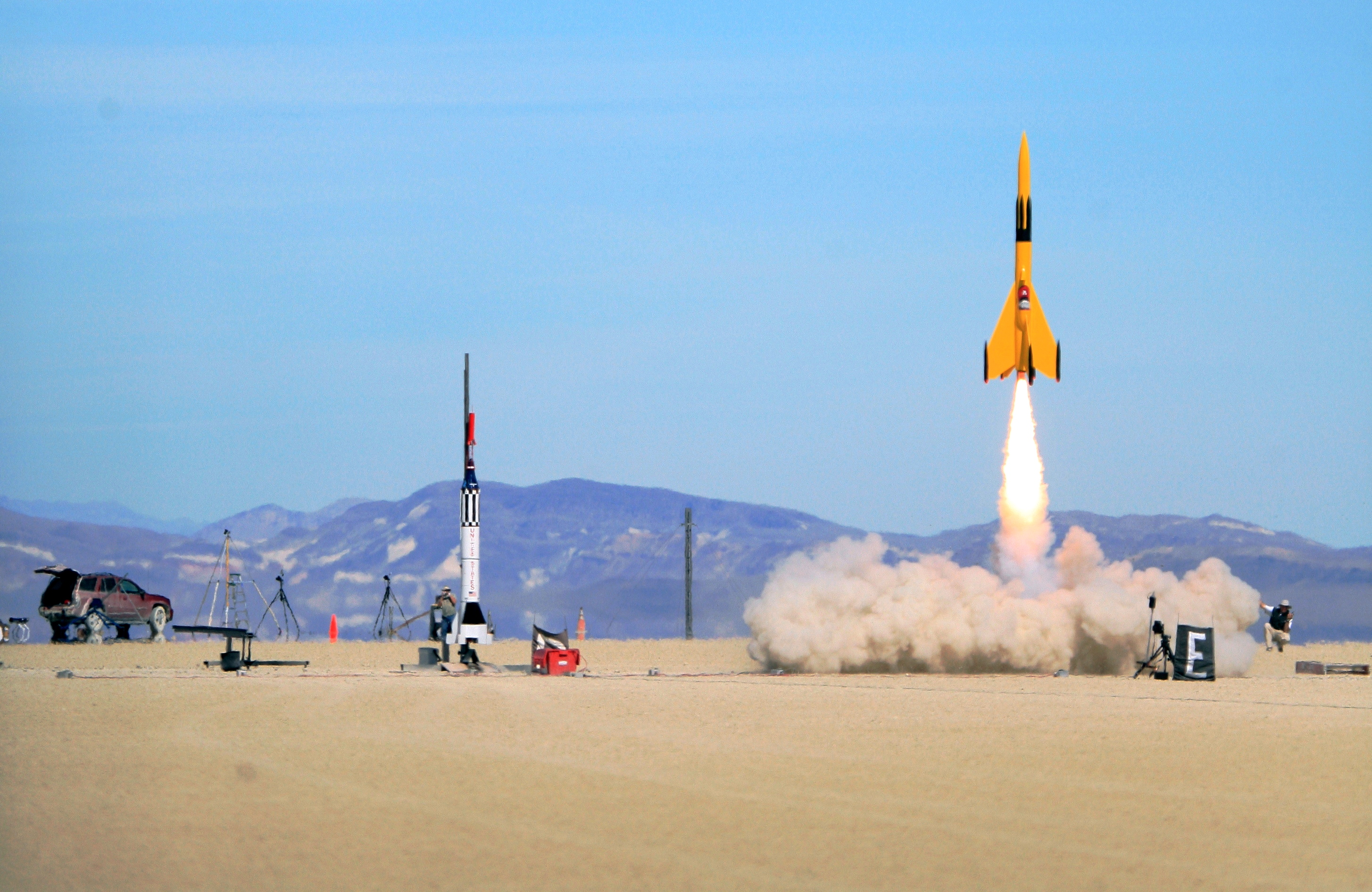
A high-power rocket launch using an APCP motor

Commercial APCP rocket engines usually come in the form of reloadable motor systems (RMS) and fully assembled single-use rocket motors. For RMS, the APCP "grains" (cylinders of propellant) are loaded into the reusable motor casing along with a sequence of insulator disks and o-rings and a (graphite or glass-filled phenolic resin) nozzle. The motor casing and closures are typically bought separately from the motor manufacturer and are often precision-machined from aluminium. The assembled RMS contains both reusable (typically metal) and disposable components.

The major APCP suppliers for hobby use are:

- Aerotech Consumer Aerospace
- Cesaroni Technology
- Loki Research
- Gorilla Rocket Motors

To achieve different visual effects and flight characteristics, hobby APCP suppliers offer a variety of different characteristic propellant types. These can range from fast-burning with little smoke and blue flame to classic white smoke and white flame. In addition, colored formulations are available to display reds, greens, blues, and even black smoke.

In the medium- and high-power rocket applications, APCP has largely replaced black powder as a rocket propellant. Compacted black powder slugs become prone to fracture in larger applications, which can result in catastrophic failure in rocket vehicles. APCP's elastic material properties make it less vulnerable to fracture from accidental shock or high-acceleration flights. Due to these attributes, widespread adoption of APCP and related propellant types in the hobby has significantly enhanced the safety of rocketry.

== Environmental and other concerns ==
The exhaust from APCP solid rocket motors contains mostly water, carbon dioxide, hydrogen chloride, and a metal oxide (typically aluminium oxide). The hydrogen chloride can easily dissolve in water and create corrosive hydrochloric acid. The environmental fate of hydrogen chloride is not well documented. The hydrochloric acid component of APCP exhaust leads to the condensation of atmospheric moisture in the plume and this enhances the visible signature of the contrail. This visible signature, among other reasons, led to research in cleaner burning propellants with no visible signatures. Minimum signature propellants contain primarily nitrogen-rich organic molecules (e.g., ammonium dinitramide) and depending on their oxidizer source can be hotter burning than APCP composite propellants.

== Regulation and legality ==
In the United States, APCP for hobby use is regulated indirectly by two non-government agencies: the National Association of Rocketry (NAR), and the Tripoli Rocketry Association (TRA). Both agencies set forth rules regarding the impulse classification of rocket motors and the level of certification required by rocketeers in order to purchase certain impulse (size) motors. The NAR and TRA require motor manufacturers to certify their motors for distribution to vendors and ultimately hobbyists. The vendor is charged with the responsibility (by the NAR and TRA) to check hobbyists for high-power rocket certification before a sale can be made. The amount of APCP that can be purchased (in the form of a rocket motor reload) correlates to the impulse classification, and therefore the quantity of APCP purchasable by a hobbyist (in any single reload kit) is regulated by the NAR and TRA.

The overarching legality concerning the implementation of APCP in rocket motors is outlined in NFPA 1125. Use of APCP outside hobby use is regulated by state and municipal fire codes. On March 16, 2009, it was ruled that APCP is not an explosive and that manufacture and use of APCP no longer requires a license or permit from the ATF.

== Sources ==
- "BATFE Lawsuit". Tripoli Rocketry Association. 2010. Archived from the original on 2012-08-06.
- Nakka, Richard (2024-04-25). "Amateur Experimental Solid Propellants". Nakka Rocketry.
- Nakka, Richard (2022-09-01). "Solid Propellant Burn Rate". Nakka Rocketry.
- Orr, Graham. "Estimation and analysis of quasi-1D solid rocket motor" (PDF). Harvey Mudd College. Archived from the original (PDF) on 2016-03-03.
- Sutton, George P.; Biblarz, Oscar (2001). Rocket Propulsion Elements. Wiley. ISBN 9780471326427.
