= Plastisol =

Suspension of polymer particles in a liquid plasticizer

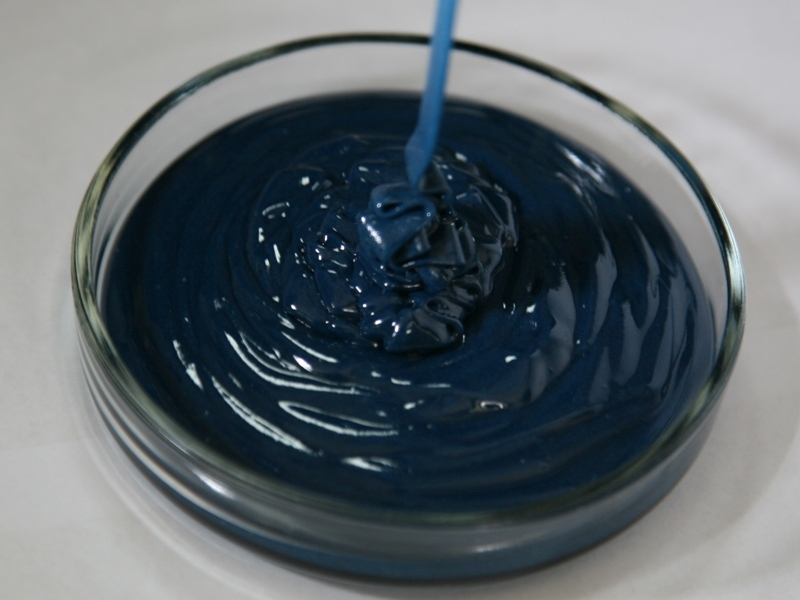
A plastisol being poured

A plastisol is a colloidal dispersion of small polymer particles, usually polyvinyl chloride (PVC), in a liquid plasticizer. When heated to around 180 °C (356 °F), the plastic particles absorb the plasticizer, causing them to swell and fuse together forming a viscous gel. Once this is cooled to below 60 °C (140 °F) it becomes a flexible, permanently plasticized solid product. This process is called 'curing'.

Commercial plastisols have good compatibility with pigments and dyes allowing for brightly coloured finished products. Before being cured they flow as a liquid, and can easily be poured into a mould, used for dip-coatings or as a textile ink for screen-printing. Once cured it has a flexible, rubbery consistency. They are commonly used for coatings, particularly in outdoor applications (roofs, furniture) or grips for tools. Mattel Toys used plastisols for years in creating such things as Barbie and Chatty Cathy toys in the 1960s and 1970s.

Plastisol can be up to 70% plasticizer by weight, although the exact ratio of ingredients may be adjusted to achieve the desired viscosity. Organosols are plastisols containing a large amount of volatile solvents to reduce viscosity making them suitable for coatable lacquers.

== Production ==
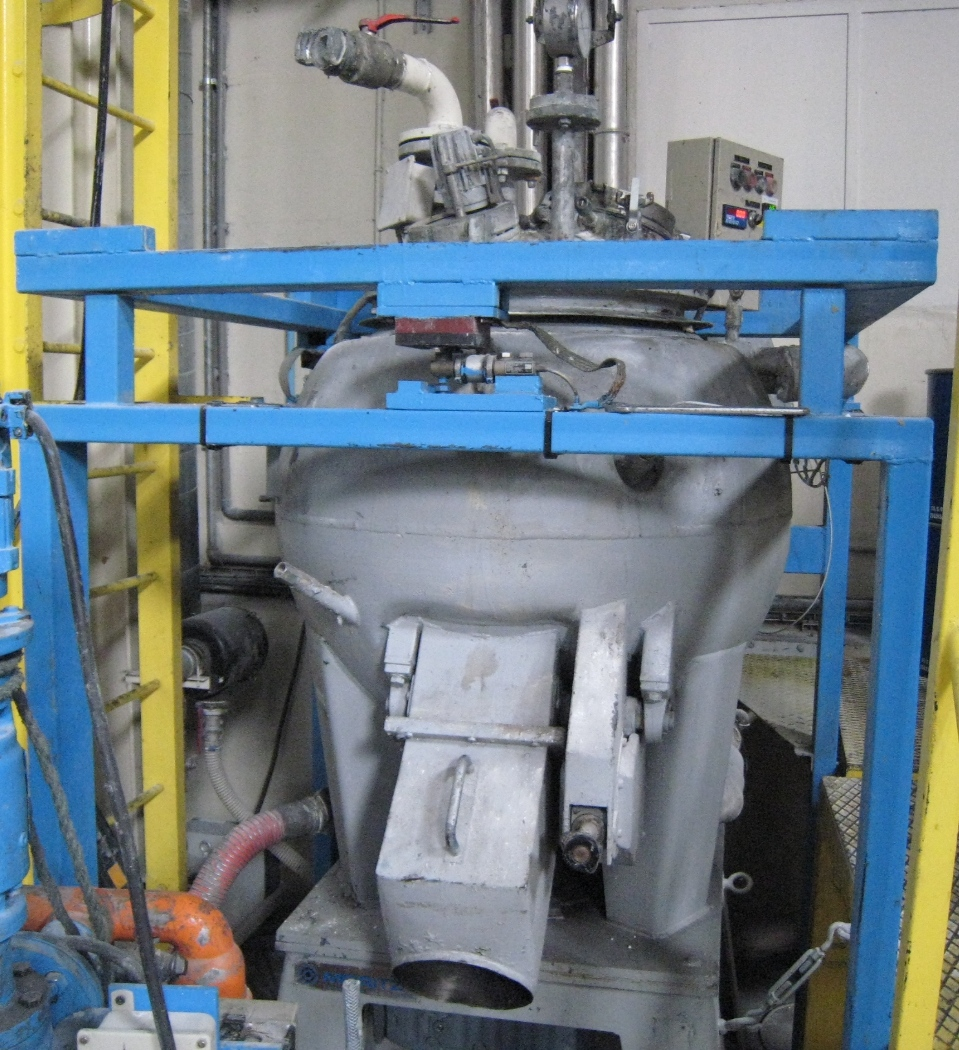
Pilot turbosphere (200 liters) equipped with water cooling system to produce plastisols

== Uses ==
=== Containers ===
Plastisol is a common sealing surface applied to steel lids that are used for consumer glassware products. Typically, a hot liquid product is poured inside a glass container. A Plastisol-lined lid is then screwed tightly onto the glass container's finish. As the product and glassware cool, a seal is formed at the interface between the Plastisol and the glass. A customer will later open the lid and hear an inrush of air into the mouth of the glassware. The steel lid will also make an additional "pop" when it returns to a relaxed, unpressurized state. These sounds indicate to the customer that the seal had been working properly up until that time.

After the seal is broken, replacing the lid may not be air- and water- tight unless the heat process is repeated to soften the Plastisol.

=== Textile ink ===
Plastisol is used as ink for screen-printing onto textiles. Plastisols are the most commonly used inks for printing designs onto garments, and are particularly useful for printing opaque graphics on dark fabrics.

Plastisol inks are not water-soluble. The ink is composed of PVC particles suspended in a plasticizing emulsion, and will not dry if left in the screen for extended periods. Garments don't need to be washed after printing. Plastisol inks are recommended for printing on colored fabric. On lighter fabric, plastisol is extremely opaque and can retain a bright image for many years with proper care.

Plastisol inks will not dry, but must be cured. Curing can be done with a flash dryer, or any oven. Most plastisols need to reach a temperature of about 180 degrees Celsius (350 Fahrenheit) for full curing. Plastisol tends to sit atop the fabric instead of soaking into the fibres, giving the print a raised, plasticized texture. Other inks can produce a softer feel. It is also used for high density (HD) prints. In this process, multiple coats of ink are applied, with a curing step between each coat.

=== Slush molding ===
Plastisol is used for slush molding or slush casting, a form of spin casting that is more complex than simple resin casting, but less expensive and less sophisticated than the injection molding used for most plastic products. It involves metal molds that are filled with liquid plastisol. When the open mold cavities are filled, the mold is spun on a high speed centrifuge to force the liquid vinyl into the fine details on the interior of the mold. Then the metal mold is placed into a heating solution, usually an industrial salt heated to about 204 °C (400 °F). The liquid vinyl cooks for a few seconds. The mold is then removed from the heating solution and the remaining liquid is poured out. This leaves a thin skin of vinyl on the interior of the metal mold. The mold is then placed back into the heating solution for three to four minutes to cure. After curing, the mold is again removed from the heating solution, cooled with water, and placed on a rack. While the vinyl part is still warm in the mold, it is very flexible and can be removed from the mold with pliers. When the parts cool, they become rigid and are ready for assembly.

The metal molds can produce an unlimited number of castings. Unlike the flexible molds used for resin casting, metal molds are not adversely affected by heat. The metal molds allow grouping of several parts in one mold cavity and several mold cavities in one mold for faster production.

=== Solid rocket propellants ===
PVC plastisol solid rocket propellants consist of an oxidizer, such as ammonium perchlorate, bound with PVC plastisol, with optional additives like metal fuels (aluminium or magnesium powder) and burn rate modifiers like copper chromite or oxamide. For example, "Standard Arcite" manufactured by the Atlantic Research Corporation is 75% ammonium perchlorate, 12.5% PVC and 12.5% dibutyl sebacate. The composition is mixed thoroughly, cast in the mold and then heated to the curing temperature of the plastisol until all parts of the propellant grain are uniformly cured. The cured grain can be machined like any PVC part.

PVC plastisol propellants were developed by the Atlantic Research Corporation and were widely used in the 1950s and 1960s in various solid rocket motors. Notable examples include the Arcas sounding rocket, the FIM-43 Redeye MANPADS and the sustainer motor of RIM-2 Terrier. They were later replaced by composite propellants with elastomeric binders, that has the advantages of curing at the lower temperatures and elasticity.

The plastisol process is used to bind polymer with metallic or metalloid fuels and a liquid oxidizer, creating electric solid propellant. This substance can be ignited and extinguished by electric impulse, providing pulsed rocket propulsion. With achievable pulse frequency reaching 60 Hz (60 ignition/extinguishing cycles per second), the thrust of such boosters can be finely controlled; combined with possible minuscule dimensions, safety and low complexity it makes them usable as the reaction control system (RCS) thrusters of nanosatellites like the CubeSat.

=== Polymer clay ===
Uncured plastisol is used as polymer clay ("Fimo"), a variety of modelling clays.

=== Road vehicles ===
Plastisol has seen limited use as a material for the construction of lightweight road vehicles. The Optare Bonito minibus, launched in 2012, was the first commercial application of widespread plastisol construction in a road vehicle, although it failed to achieve any sales. Use of plastisol in road vehicle construction remains extremely limited as of 2019.

=== Soft plastic fishing baits ===
Plastisol is used in the manufacturing of soft plastic bait. Liquid plastisol is combined with various pigments, glitters, and powders, and is then injected into aluminum molds, forming soft lures effective in catching various species of fish.
