= Barbara McGuire (artist) =

American artist

Barbara McGuire is an American artist who is recognized for her works in polymer clay, painting and jewelry design. She has written twelve books and numerous magazine articles on design and instruction including books on polymer clay, wire, beads, and children's art. Her books have been described as "among the most articulate and thoughtful books on polymer clay out there." Her artwork incorporates a strong element of traditional design with innovative materials and artifacts.

McGuire has appeared as a regular guest of The Carol Duvall Show and has developed stamps, templates and molds for polymer clay.

== Background ==
Growing up in Traverse City, Michigan, Barbara McGuire was always fascinated by art as a child, and after taking art classes, sold her first oil painting at age 13. Although she wanted to be a professional artist, she elected to follow her parents' advice and enter the restaurant business. She did, however, continue to create artwork as a hobby, and sell her work at local art shows.

After moving to San Francisco in 1980, she began working with polymer clay because it required less bulky supplies than other mediums. She also decided to pursue a career in artwork and took a job with craft distributor Stanislaus Imports. On weekends, she continued to attend craft fairs where she sold her artwork.

During a craft fair, McGuire came to the realization that there was a market for pre-made polymer clay canes and decided to go into product development. She approached American Art Clay Company (AMACO) with her idea. The company liked the idea and decided to manufacture the canes and to have her write a how-to book for the product, titled Friendly Clay Millefiori Cane.

Shortly thereafter, she became the creative director of Accent Import-Export, the importers of Fimo clay. In 1999, she published Foundations in Polymer Clay Design, a book which helped distinguish her as one of creative leaders in her field. The book has been described as "a joy to look at" and "a must have for Polymer Clayers". In 2002, she released Creative Stamping in Polymer Clay which Polymer Clay Polyzine described as "a great reference chart for people ... who are adventurous with materials but don't ... really understand all the possibilities out there."

McGuire has continued to release books at regular intervals, and to date, she has written twelve books, with a thirteenth—Faces In Clay—in progress. She has also written crafting articles for numerous magazines and other publications.

In addition to writing, McGuire has been an innovator in her field. She is the inventor of the "Duo-Stamp", a two-sided rubber stamp with an inverse and converse design that is popular with the stamping community. Her "Bead Prints" have been described as "amazingly artistic products of great quality and usefulness".

McGuire is currently affiliated with Polyform, who manufacture her new concept, "Shapelets", which are templates used for cropping and cutting shapes for jewelry embellishment and design.

McGuire's profile within the field has led to her appearance on several American crafting shows, including The Carol Duvall Show where she is a regular contributor. Topics covered during her appearances include both polymer clay crafts and beading/jewelry making.

McGuire describes her work as edgy with "an element of surprise and non-conformity" and says that her "ultimate goal is to give children and adults the permission and acknowledgment to be creative". She currently resides in Mars Hill, NC, where she runs a studio at Mars Landing Gallery, a local art gallery where she also sells her work. She has two children. Her eldest son, Robert, currently serves in the US Army.

== Bibliography ==
- Creative Canes (Design Originals, 2007) ISBN 1-57421-619-8
- Creative Stamping in Polymer Clay (North Light Books, 2002). ISBN 1-58180-155-6
- Embracing Child Art: Projects for Grownups to Keep and Treasure (Krause Publications, 2001) ISBN 0-87341-985-5
- Expressions in Clay (Design Originals, 2003) ISBN 1-57421-489-6
- Foundations in Polymer Clay Design (kp books, 1999). ISBN 0-87341-800-X
- Friendly Clay Millefiori Cane (American Art Clay Company)
- Images on Clay (Design Originals)
- Images on Clay 2 (Design Originals)
- Mad for Millefiori: Just Slice, Shape & Bake Ready-Made Clay Canes (Hot Off the Press, 1994) ISBN 1-56231-236-7
- Polymer Clay For Beginners (Everything Crafts) with Lisa Pavelka (Adams Media Corporation, 2005) ISBN 1-59337-230-2
- Silver & Stones Bead Jewelry (Design Originals, 2006) ISBN 1-57421-605-8
- Wire in Design: Modern Wire Art & Mixed Media (Krause Publications, 2001). ISBN 0-87349-218-8
