= Performance curve =

In engineering, performance curve may refer to:

- Load testing curve, in physical or software testing
- Thrust curve, in rocketry
