= The Carol Duvall Show =

American television series

- Genre: Family entertainment
- Directed by: Don Colliver; Jim Stimpson
- Presented by: Carol Duvall
- Country of origin: United States
- Original language: English

Production
- Production company: Weller/Grossman Productions

Original release
- Network: HGTV
- Release: 1 December 1994 – 2005

The Carol Duvall Show is an arts and crafts show which aired on the HGTV cable channel from 1994 to 2005 hosted by Carol Duvall. It was also broadcast on the DIY Network from 2005 until late-2009. Recordings of segments from the show can be viewed on their website.

The show is devoted to demonstrating and teaching a wide variety of crafts from very basic "cut and glue" projects to intricate polymer clay creations. Duvall's program was one of the original offerings on the newly founded Home & Garden Television network in 1994, and it has remained one of the lifestyle network's most popular shows throughout its 12-year run. She introduced many polymer clay artists to the community including Judy Belcher, Maureen Carlson, Kim Cavender, Katherine Dewey, Emi Fukushima, Syndee Holt, Debbie Jackson, Donna Kato, Barbara McGuire, Ann Mitchell, Karen Mitchell, Becky Meverden, Lisa Pavelka, Gail Ritchey, Nan Roche, Michelle Ross, and Bob Wiley who have inspired countless polymer enthusiasts.

The "Carol Duvall Show" was a popular DIY and crafting television program that aired from 1994 to 2005. Hosted by Carol Duvall, the show featured a wide range of creative projects, crafting techniques, and interviews with skilled artisans. It became a go-to source for enthusiasts seeking inspiration and guidance in various crafting endeavors, showcasing everything from paper crafts to home decor ideas. The program had a significant impact on the crafting community and left a lasting legacy in the world of do-it-yourself crafting.

The show also featured interviews with crafters and fine artists - painters, sculptors, glass-blowers, etc. with footage of them at work in their studios.

The cancellation of the show on HGTV caused dismay among many of her fans; whose protests might have influenced the decision to continue broadcasting it on the DIY Network (owned by the same parent company Scripps Networks).

== Sources ==
- The Carol Duvall Show
- Carol Duvall Balances Her Life
