= Kato polyclay =

Brand of polymer clay

Kato polyclay is a brand of oven-hardening polymer clay. The concept of Kato Polyclay was created by the collaboration of Donna Kato, a polymer clay artist, and Van Aken International, a manufacturer of modeling compounds. The material is intended for decorative use such as jewelry, dolls, boxes or vases.

Unlike other brands that are generally baked at 275 °F (135 °C), Kato polyclay can be cured up to 300 °F (149 °C) for 30 minutes per 1/4 in (6.4 mm) of thickness. It is available in 18 colors including neon, metallics and translucent.

Most polymer clays require strict adherence to recommended times or else the colors may darken. Kato polyclay may be cured for extended times without color change. However, recommended Kato polyclay curing temperature is ranged from 275 to 325 °F (135 to 163 °C) for 10–30 minutes per 1/4 in (6.4 mm) of thickness. This polymer clay is also known for its strength after curing.

Other products in this line include: Poly Paste, Repel Gel, Liquid Polyclay and COLOR Liquid Polyclay, Kato NuBlade+, and Kato Clay Roller.

== Related materials ==
Other brands of polymer clay include Fimo, ProSculpt, Sculpey, Premo, Cernit, Friendly Clay, Formello and Modello.
