= Solid-propellant rocket =

Rocket with a motor that uses solid propellants

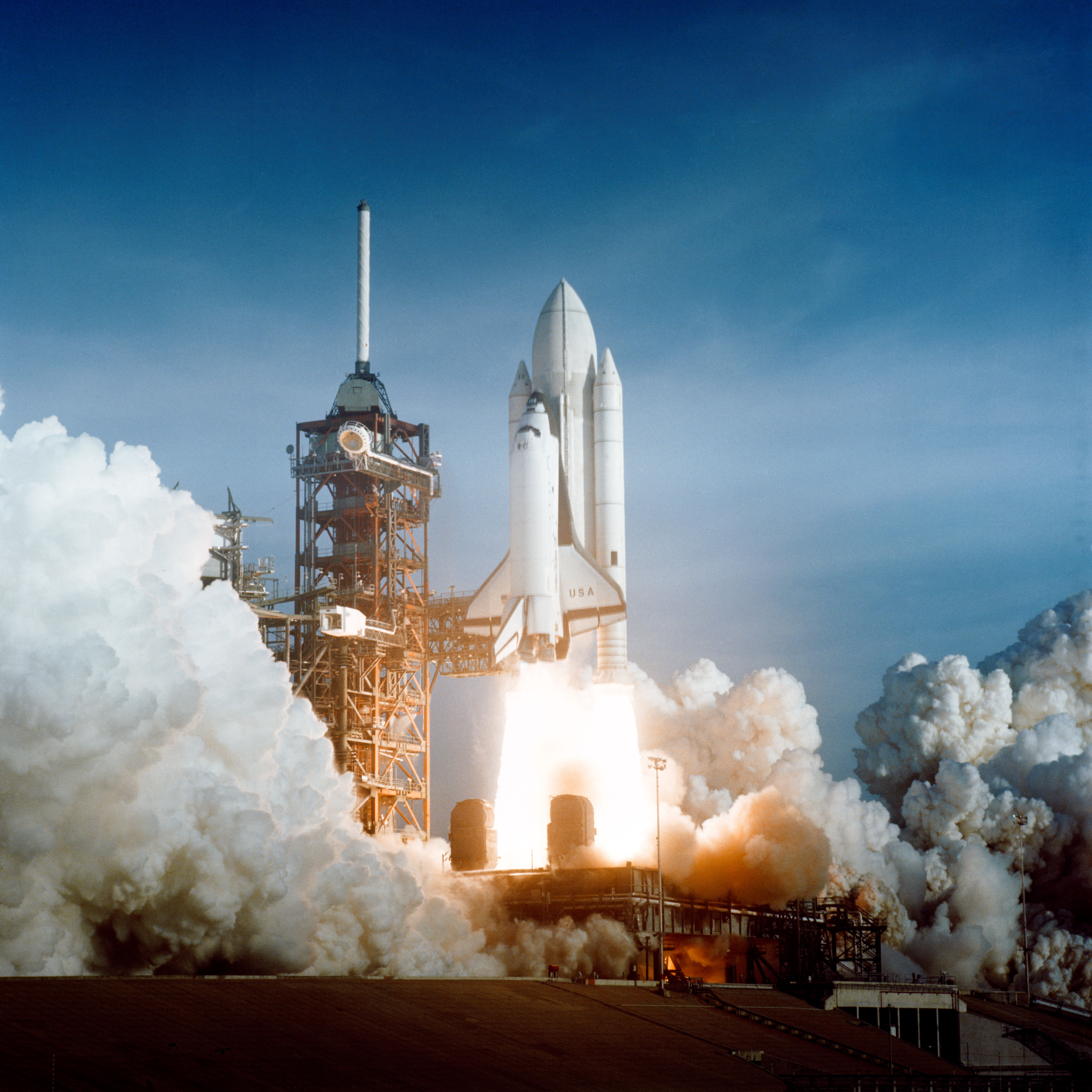
The Space Shuttle was launched with the help of two solid-fuel boosters known as SRBs

A solid-propellant rocket or solid rocket is a rocket with a rocket engine that uses solid propellants (fuel/oxidizer). The earliest rockets were solid-fuel rockets powered by gunpowder. The inception of gunpowder rockets in warfare can be credited to the medieval Chinese, and in the 13th century, the Mongols played a pivotal role in facilitating their westward adoption.

All rockets used some form of solid or powdered propellant until the 20th century, when liquid-propellant rockets offered more efficient and controllable alternatives. Because of their simplicity and reliability, solid rockets are still used today in military armaments worldwide, model rockets, solid rocket boosters and on larger applications.

Since solid-fuel rockets can remain in storage for an extended period without much propellant degradation, and since they almost always launch reliably, they have been frequently used in military applications such as missiles. The lower performance of solid propellants (as compared to liquids) does not favor their use as primary propulsion in modern medium-to-large launch vehicles customarily used for commercial satellites and major space probes. Solids are, however, frequently used as strap-on boosters to increase payload capacity or as spin-stabilized add-on upper stages when higher-than-normal velocities are required. Solid rockets are used as light launch vehicles for low Earth orbit (LEO) payloads under 2 tons or escape payloads up to 500 kilograms (1,100 lb).

== Basic concepts ==
A simplified diagram of a solid-fuel rocket.: 1. A solid fuel-oxidizer mixture (propellant) is packed into the rocket, with a cylindrical hole in the middle.; 2. An igniter combusts the surface of the propellant.; 3. The cylindrical hole in the propellant acts as a combustion chamber.; 4. The hot exhaust is choked at the throat, which, among other things, dictates the amount of thrust produced.; 5. Exhaust exits the rocket.

A simple solid rocket motor consists of a casing, nozzle, grain (propellant charge), and igniter.

The solid grain mass burns in a predictable fashion to produce exhaust gases, the flow of which is described by Taylor–Culick flow. The nozzle dimensions are calculated to maintain a designed chamber pressure while producing thrust from the exhaust gases.

Once ignited, a simple solid rocket motor cannot be shut off, as it contains all the ingredients necessary for combustion within the chamber in which they are burned. More advanced solid rocket motors can be throttled, or extinguished and re-ignited, by control of the nozzle geometry or through the use of vent ports. Furthermore, pulsed rocket motors that burn in segments that can be ignited upon command are available.

Modern designs may also include a steerable nozzle for guidance, avionics, recovery hardware (parachutes), self-destruct mechanisms, APUs, controllable tactical motors, controllable divert and attitude control motors, and thermal management materials.

== History ==
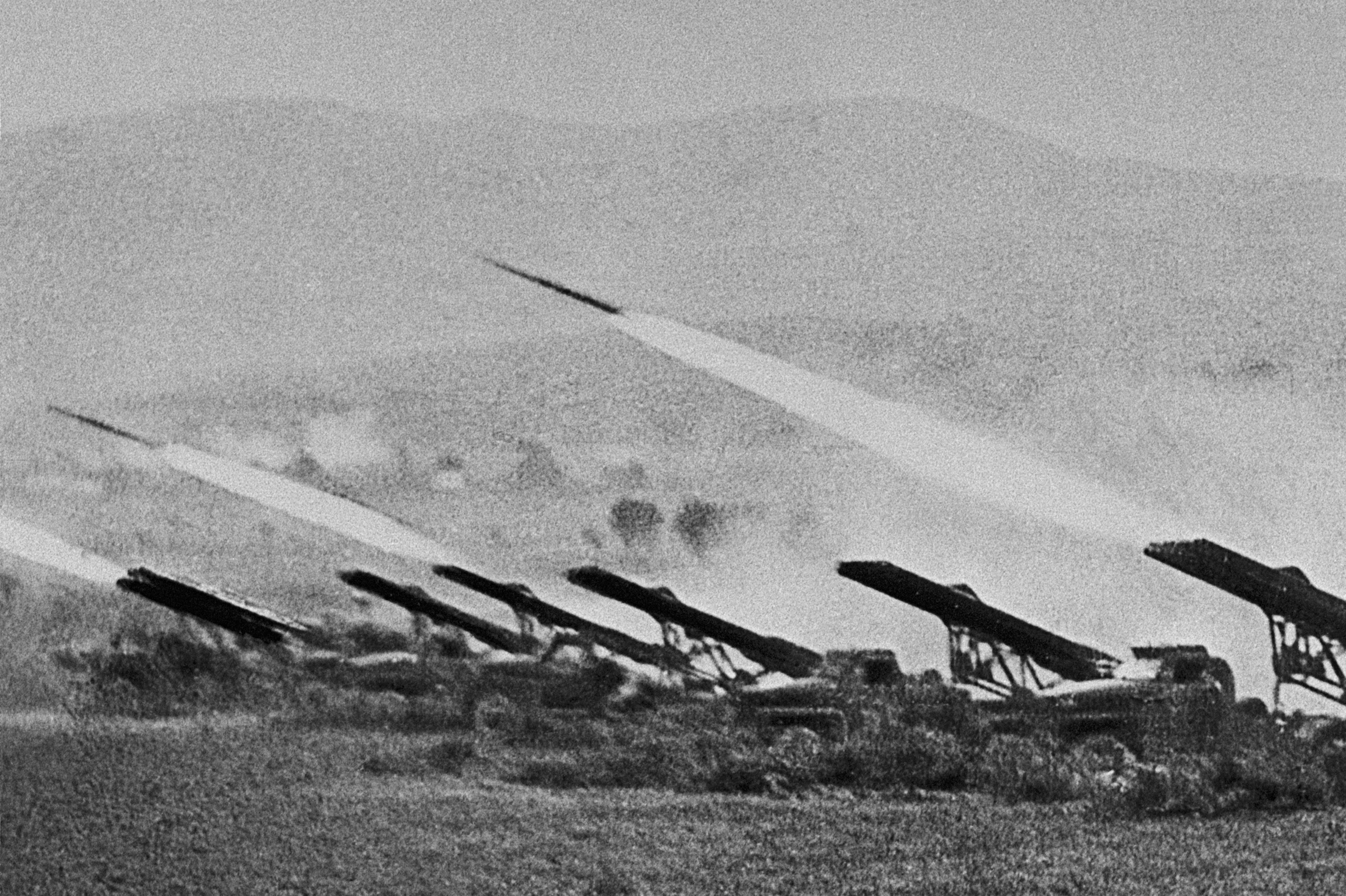
A battery of Katyusha rocket launchers fires at German forces during the Battle of Stalingrad, 6 October 1942

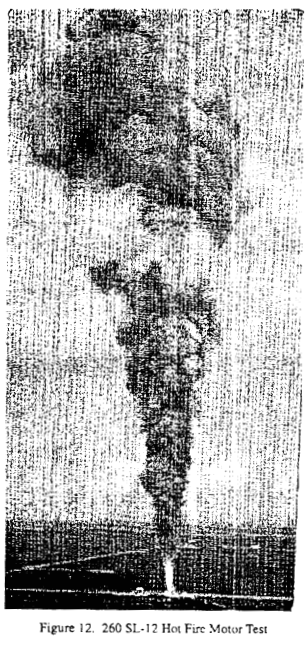
Aerojet 260 motor test, 25 September 1965

The medieval Song dynasty Chinese invented the solid-propellant rocket. Illustrations and descriptions in the 14th century Chinese military treatise Huolongjing by the Ming dynasty military writer and philosopher Jiao Yu confirm that the Chinese in 1232 used solid propellant rockets then known as "fire arrows" to drive back the Mongols during the Siege of Kaifeng (1232). Each arrow took the form of a simple, solid-propellant rocket tube that was filled with gunpowder. One open end allowed the gas to escape and was attached to a long stick that acted as a guidance system for flight direction control.

The first rockets with tubes of cast iron were used by the Kingdom of Mysore under Hyder Ali and Tipu Sultan in the 1750s. These rockets had a reach of targets up to a mile and a half away. These were extremely effective in the Second Anglo-Mysore War that ended in a humiliating defeat for the British East India Company. Word of the success of the Mysore rockets against the British triggered research in England, France, Ireland and elsewhere. When the British finally conquered the fort of Srirangapatana in 1799, hundreds of rockets were shipped off to the Royal Arsenal near London to be reverse-engineered. This led to the first industrial manufacture of military rockets with the Congreve rocket in 1804.

In 1921 the Soviet research and development laboratory Gas Dynamics Laboratory began developing solid-propellant rockets, which resulted in the first launch in 1928, that flew for approximately 1,300 metres. These rockets were used in 1931 for the world's first successful use of rockets to assist take-off of aircraft. The research continued from 1933 by the Reactive Scientific Research Institute (RNII) with the development of the RS-82 and RS-132 rockets, including designing several variations for ground-to-air, ground-to-ground, air-to-ground and air-to-air combat. The earliest known use by the Soviet Air Force of aircraft-launched unguided anti-aircraft rockets in combat against heavier-than-air aircraft took place in August 1939, during the Battle of Khalkhin Gol. In June 1938, the RNII began developing a multiple rocket launcher based on the RS-132 rocket. In August 1939, the completed product was the BM-13 / Katyusha rocket launcher. Towards the end of 1938 the first significant large scale testing of the rocket launchers took place, 233 rockets of various types were used. A salvo of rockets could completely straddle a target at a range of 5,500 metres (3.4 mi). By the end of World War II total production of rocket launchers reached about 10,000. with 12 million rockets of the RS type produced for the Soviet armed forces.

In the United States modern castable composite solid rocket motors were invented by the American aerospace engineer Jack Parsons at Caltech in 1942 when he replaced double base propellant with roofing asphalt and potassium perchlorate. This made possible slow-burning rocket motors of adequate size and with sufficient shelf-life for jet-assisted take off applications. Charles Bartley, employed at JPL (Caltech), substituted curable synthetic rubber for the gooey asphalt, creating a flexible but geometrically stable load-bearing propellant grain that bonded securely to the motor casing. This made possible much larger solid rocket motors. Atlantic Research Corporation significantly boosted composite propellant I_{sp} in 1954 by increasing the amount of powdered aluminium in the propellant to as much as 20%.

Solid-propellant rocket technology got its largest boost in technical innovation, size and capability with the various mid-20th century government initiatives to develop increasingly capable military missiles. After initial designs of ballistic missile military technology designed with liquid-propellant rockets in the 1940s and 1950s, both the Soviet Union and the United States embarked on major initiatives to develop solid-propellant local, regional, and intercontinental ballistic missiles, including solid-propellant missiles that could be launched from air or sea. Many other governments also developed these military technologies over the next 50 years.

By the later 1980s and continuing to 2020, these government-developed highly-capable solid rocket technologies have been applied to orbital spaceflight by many government-directed programs, most often as booster rockets to add extra thrust during the early ascent of their primarily liquid rocket launch vehicles. Some designs have had solid rocket upper stages as well. Examples flying in the 2010s include the European Ariane 5, US Atlas V and Space Shuttle, and Japan's H-II.

The largest solid rocket motors ever built were Aerojet's three 6.60-meter (260 in) monolithic solid motors cast in Florida. Motors 260 SL-1 and SL-2 were 6.63 meters (261 in) in diameter, 24.59 meters (80 ft 8 in) long, weighed 842,900 kilograms (1,858,300 lb), and had a maximum thrust of 16 MN (3,500,000 lbf). Burn duration was two minutes. The nozzle throat was large enough to walk through standing up. The motor was capable of serving as a 1-to-1 replacement for the 8-engine Saturn I liquid-propellant first stage but was never used as such. Motor 260 SL-3 was of similar length and weight but had a maximum thrust of 24 MN (5,400,000 lbf) and a shorter duration.

== Design ==
Design begins with the total impulse required, which determines the fuel and oxidizer mass. Grain geometry and chemistry are then chosen to satisfy the required motor characteristics.

The following are chosen or solved simultaneously. The results are exact dimensions for grain, nozzle, and case geometries:

- The grain burns at a predictable rate, given its surface area and chamber pressure.
- The chamber pressure is determined by the nozzle throat diameter and grain burn rate.
- Allowable chamber pressure is a function of casing design.
- The length of burn time is determined by the grain "web thickness".

The grain may or may not be bonded to the casing. Case-bonded motors are more difficult to design, since the deformation of the case and the grain under flight must be compatible.

Common modes of failure in solid rocket motors include fracture of the grain, failure of case bonding, and air pockets in the grain. All of these produce an instantaneous increase in burn surface area and a corresponding increase in exhaust gas production rate and pressure, which may rupture the casing.

Another failure mode is casing seal failure. Seals are required in casings that have to be opened to load the grain. Once a seal fails, hot gas will erode the escape path and result in failure. This was the cause of the Space Shuttle Challenger disaster.

== Grain geometry ==
Solid rocket fuel deflagrates from the surface of exposed propellant in the combustion chamber. In this fashion, the geometry of the propellant inside the rocket motor plays an important role in the overall motor performance. As the surface of the propellant burns, the shape evolves (a subject of study in internal ballistics), most often changing the propellant surface area exposed to the combustion gases. Since the propellant volume is equal to the cross sectional area A_{s} times the fuel length, the volumetric propellant consumption rate is the cross sectional area times the linear burn rate ḃ, and the instantaneous mass flow rate of combustion gases generated is equal to the volumetric rate times the fuel density ρ:

$$\dot{m} = \rho \dot{b} A_s$$

Several geometric configurations are often used depending on the application and desired thrust curve:

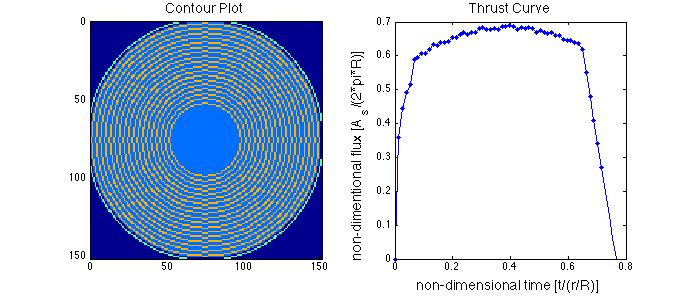
Circular bore simulation

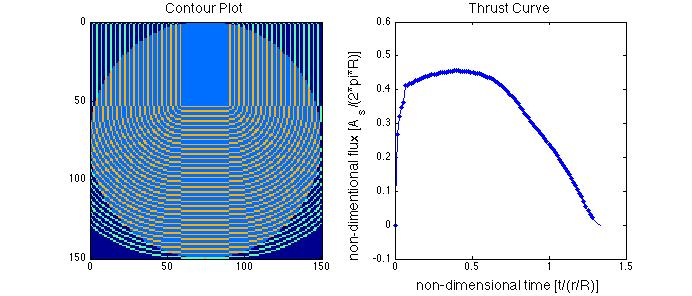
C-slot simulation

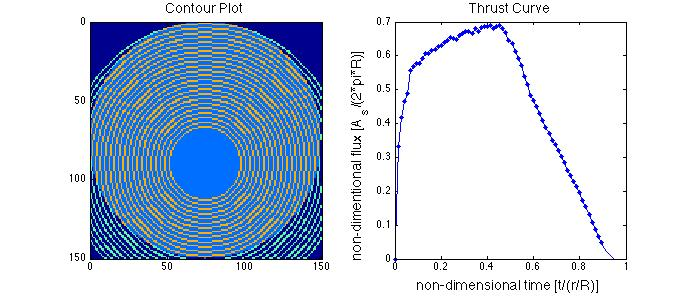
Moon burner simulation

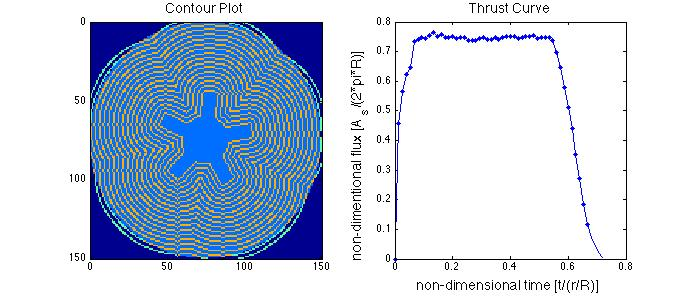
5-point finocyl simulation
- Circular bore: if in BATES configuration, produces a progressive-regressive (increasing and then decreasing over time) thrust curve.
  - Moon burner: an off-center circular bore produces a progressive-regressive long burn which has slight asymmetric CG characteristics.
- End burner: propellant burns from one axial end to other, producing a steady long burn which has thermal difficulties and shifts the center of gravity (CG) over time.
- C-slot: propellant with large wedge cut out of the side (along axial direction), producing fairly long regressive (decreasing over time) thrust, though it has thermal difficulties and asymmetric CG characteristics.
- Finocyl: usually a 5- or 6-legged star-like shape that can produce very level thrust, with a bit quicker burn than circular bore due to increased surface area.

== Casing ==
The casing may be constructed from a range of materials. Cardboard is used for small black powder model motors, whereas aluminium is used for larger composite-fuel hobby motors. Steel was used for the space shuttle boosters. Filament-wound graphite epoxy casings are used for high-performance motors.

The casing must be designed to withstand the pressure and resulting stresses of the rocket motor, possibly at elevated temperature. For design, the casing is considered a pressure vessel.

To protect the casing from corrosive hot gases, a sacrificial thermal liner on the inside of the casing is often implemented, which ablates to prolong the life of the motor casing.

== Nozzle ==
A convergent-divergent design accelerates the exhaust gas out of the nozzle to produce thrust. The nozzle must be constructed from a material that can withstand the heat of the combustion gas flow. Often, heat-resistant carbon-based materials are used, such as amorphous graphite or reinforced carbon–carbon.

Some designs include directional control of the exhaust. This can be accomplished by gimballing the nozzle, as in the Space Shuttle SRBs, by the use of jet vanes in the exhaust as in the V-2 rocket, or by liquid injection thrust vectoring (LITV).

LITV consists of injecting a liquid into the exhaust stream after the nozzle throat. The liquid then vaporizes, and in most cases chemically reacts, adding mass flow to one side of the exhaust stream and thus providing a control moment. For example, the Titan IIIC solid boosters injected dinitrogen tetroxide for LITV; the tanks can be seen on the sides of the rocket between the main center stage and the boosters.

An early Minuteman first stage used a single motor with four gimballed nozzles to provide pitch, yaw, and roll control.

== Performance ==
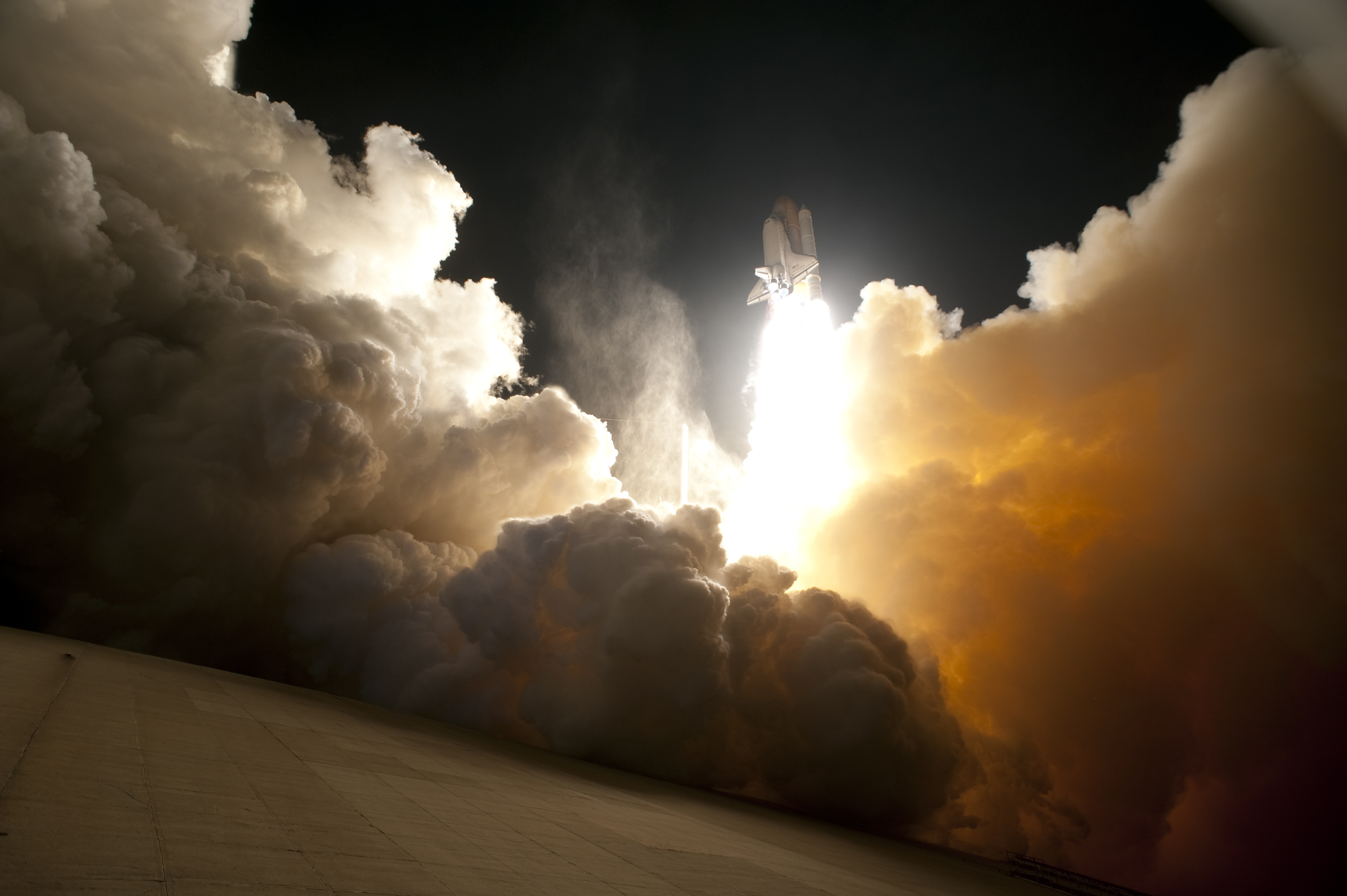
An exhaust cloud engulfs Launch Pad 39A at NASA's Kennedy Space Center as the Space Shuttle Endeavour lifts off.

A typical, well-designed ammonium perchlorate composite propellant (APCP) first-stage motor may have a vacuum specific impulse (I_{sp}) as high as 285.6 seconds (2.801 km/s) (Titan IVB SRMU). This compares to 339.3 s (3.327 km/s) for RP1/LOX (RD-180) and 452.3 s (4.436 km/s) for LH_{2}/LOX (Block II RS-25) bipropellant engines. Upper stage specific impulses are somewhat greater: as much as 303.8 s (2.979 km/s) for APCP (Orbus 6E), 359 s (3.52 km/s) for RP1/LOX (RD-0124) and 465.5 s (4.565 km/s) for LH_{2}/LOX (RL10B-2).

Propellant fractions are usually somewhat higher for (non-segmented) solid propellant first stages than for upper stages. The 53,000-kilogram (117,000 lb) Castor 120 first stage has a propellant mass fraction of 92.23% while the 14,000-kilogram (31,000 lb) Castor 30 upper stage developed for Orbital Science's Taurus II COTS (Commercial Off The Shelf) (International Space Station resupply) launch vehicle has a 91.3% propellant fraction with 2.9% graphite epoxy motor casing, 2.4% nozzle, igniter and thrust vector actuator, and 3.4% non-motor hardware including such things as payload mount, interstage adapter, cable raceway, instrumentation, etc. Castor 120 and Castor 30 are 2.36 and 2.34 meters (93 and 92 in) in diameter, respectively, and serve as stages on the Athena IC and IIC commercial launch vehicles. A four-stage Athena II using Castor 120s as both first and second stages became the first commercially developed launch vehicle to launch a lunar probe (Lunar Prospector) in 1998.

Solid rockets can provide high thrust for relatively low cost. For this reason, solids have been used as initial stages in rockets (for example the Space Shuttle), while reserving high specific impulse engines, especially less massive hydrogen-fueled engines, for higher stages. In addition, solid rockets have a long history as the final boost stage for satellites due to their simplicity, reliability, compactness and reasonably high mass fraction. A spin-stabilized solid rocket motor is sometimes added when extra velocity is required, such as for a mission to a comet or the outer solar system, because a spinner does not require a guidance system (on the newly added stage). Thiokol's extensive family of mostly titanium-cased Star space motors has been widely used, especially on Delta launch vehicles and as spin-stabilized upper stages to launch satellites from the cargo bay of the Space Shuttle. Star motors have propellant fractions as high as 94.6% but add-on structures and equipment reduce the operating mass fraction by 2% or more.

Higher performing solid rocket propellants are used in large strategic missiles (as opposed to commercial launch vehicles). HMX, C_{4}H_{8}N_{4}(NO_{2})_{4}, a nitramine with greater energy than ammonium perchlorate, was used in the propellant of the Peacekeeper ICBM and is the main ingredient in NEPE-75 propellant used in the Trident II D-5 Fleet Ballistic Missile. It is because of explosive hazard that the higher energy military solid propellants containing HMX are not used in commercial launch vehicles except when the LV is an adapted ballistic missile already containing HMX propellant (Minotaur IV and V based on the retired Peacekeeper ICBMs). The Naval Air Weapons Station at China Lake, California, developed a new compound, C_{6}H_{6}N_{6}(NO_{2})_{6}, called simply CL-20 (China Lake compound ^{#}20). Compared to HMX, CL-20 has 14% more energy per mass, 20% more energy per volume, and a higher oxygen-to-fuel ratio. One of the motivations for development of these very high energy density military solid propellants is to achieve mid-course exo-atmospheric ABM capability from missiles small enough to fit in existing ship-based below-deck vertical launch tubes and air-mobile truck-mounted launch tubes. CL-20 propellant compliant with Congress' 2004 insensitive munitions (IM) law has been demonstrated and may, as its cost comes down, be suitable for use in commercial launch vehicles, with a very significant increase in performance compared with the currently favored APCP solid propellants. With a specific impulse of 309 s already demonstrated by Peacekeeper's second stage using HMX propellant, the higher energy of CL-20 propellant can be expected to increase specific impulse to around 320 s in similar ICBM or launch vehicle upper stage applications, without the explosive hazard of HMX.

An attractive attribute for military use is the ability for solid rocket propellant to remain loaded in the rocket for long durations and then be reliably launched at a moment's notice.

== Propellant families ==
=== Black powder (gunpowder) propellant ===
Black powder (gunpowder) is composed of charcoal (fuel), potassium nitrate (oxidizer), and sulfur (fuel and catalyst). It is one of the oldest pyrotechnic compositions with application to rocketry. In modern times, black powder finds use in low-power model rockets (such as Estes and Quest rockets), as it is cheap and fairly easy to produce. The fuel grain is typically a mixture of pressed fine powder (into a solid, hard slug), with a burn rate that is highly dependent upon exact composition and operating conditions. The specific impulse of black powder is low, around 80 s (0.78 km/s). The grain is sensitive to fracture and, therefore, catastrophic failure. Black powder does not typically find use in motors above 40 newtons (9.0 pounds-force) thrust.

=== Zinc–sulfur (ZS) propellants ===
Composed of powdered zinc metal and powdered sulfur (oxidizer), ZS or "micrograin" is another pressed propellant that does not find any practical application outside specialized amateur rocketry circles due to its poor performance (as most ZS burns outside the combustion chamber) and fast linear burn rates on the order of 2 m/s. ZS is most often employed as a novelty propellant as the rocket accelerates extremely quickly leaving a spectacular large orange fireball behind it.

=== Double-base (DB) propellants ===
DB propellants are composed of two monopropellant fuel components where one typically acts as a high-energy (yet unstable) monopropellant and the other acts as a lower-energy stabilizing (and gelling) monopropellant. In typical circumstances, nitroglycerin is dissolved in a nitrocellulose gel and solidified with additives. DB propellants are implemented in applications where minimal smoke is required yet a medium-high I_{sp} of roughly 235 s (2.30 km/s) is required. The addition of metal fuels (such as aluminium) can increase performance to around 250 s (2.5 km/s), though metal oxide nucleation in the exhaust can turn the smoke opaque.

=== Composite propellants ===
A powdered oxidizer and powdered metal fuel are intimately mixed and immobilized with a rubbery binder (that also acts as a fuel). Composite propellants are often either ammonium-nitrate-based (ANCP) or ammonium-perchlorate-based (APCP). Ammonium nitrate composite propellant often uses magnesium and/or aluminium as fuel and delivers medium performance (I_{sp} of about 210 s (2.1 km/s)) whereas ammonium perchlorate composite propellant often uses aluminium fuel and delivers high performance: vacuum I_{sp} up to 296 s (2.90 km/s) with a single-piece nozzle or 304 s (2.98 km/s) with a high-area-ratio telescoping nozzle. Aluminium is used as fuel because it has a reasonable specific energy density, a high volumetric energy density, and is difficult to ignite accidentally. Composite propellants are cast, and retain their shape after the rubber binder, such as Hydroxyl-terminated polybutadiene (HTPB), cross-links (solidifies) with the aid of a curative additive. Because of its high performance, moderate ease of manufacturing, and moderate cost, APCP finds widespread use in space, military, and amateur rockets, whereas cheaper and less efficient ANCP finds use in amateur rocketry and gas generators. Ammonium dinitramide, NH_{4}N(NO_{2})_{2}, is being considered as a 1-to-1 chlorine-free substitute for ammonium perchlorate in composite propellants. Unlike ammonium nitrate, ADN can be substituted for AP without a loss in motor performance.

Polyurethane-bound aluminium-APCP solid fuel was used in the submarine-launched Polaris missiles. APCP used in the space shuttle Solid Rocket Boosters consisted of ammonium perchlorate (oxidizer, 69.6% by weight), aluminium (fuel, 16%), iron oxide (a catalyst, 0.4%), polybutadiene acrylonitrile (PBAN) polymer (a non-urethane rubber binder that held the mixture together and acted as secondary fuel, 12.04%), and an epoxy curing agent (1.96%). It developed a specific impulse of 242 seconds (2.37 km/s) at sea level or 268 seconds (2.63 km/s) in a vacuum. The 2005–2009 Constellation Program was to use a similar PBAN-bound APCP.

In 2009, a group succeeded in creating a propellant of water and nanoaluminium (ALICE).

==== "Candy" propellants ====
In general, rocket candy propellants are an oxidizer (typically potassium nitrate) and a sugar fuel (typically dextrose, sorbitol, or sucrose) that are cast into shape by gently melting the propellant constituents together and pouring or packing the amorphous colloid into a mold. Candy propellants generate a low-medium specific impulse of roughly 130 s (1.3 km/s) and, thus, are used primarily by amateur and experimental rocketeers.

=== High-energy composite (HEC) propellants ===
Typical HEC propellants start with a standard composite propellant mixture (such as APCP) and add a high-energy explosive to the mix. This extra component usually is in the form of small crystals of RDX or HMX, both of which have higher energy than ammonium perchlorate. Despite a modest increase in specific impulse, implementation is limited due to the increased hazards of the high-explosive additives.

=== Composite modified double base propellants ===
Composite modified double base propellants start with a nitrocellulose/nitroglycerin double base propellant as a binder and add solids (typically ammonium perchlorate (AP) and powdered aluminium) normally used in composite propellants. The ammonium perchlorate makes up the oxygen deficit introduced by using nitrocellulose, improving the overall specific impulse. The aluminium improves specific impulse as well as combustion stability. High performing propellants such as NEPE-75 used to fuel the Trident II D-5 SLBM replace most of the AP with polyethylene glycol-bound HMX, further increasing specific impulse. The mixing of composite and double base propellant ingredients has become so common as to blur the functional definition of double base propellants.

=== Minimum-signature (smokeless) propellants ===
One of the most active areas of solid propellant research is the development of high-energy, minimum-signature propellant using C_{6}H_{6}N_{6}(NO_{2})_{6} CL-20 (China Lake compound #20), which has 14% higher energy per mass and 20% higher energy density than HMX. The new propellant has been successfully developed and tested in tactical rocket motors. The propellant is non-polluting: acid-free, solid particulates-free, and lead-free. It is also smokeless and has only a faint shock diamond pattern that is visible in the otherwise transparent exhaust. Without the bright flame and dense smoke trail produced by the burning of aluminized propellants, these smokeless propellants all but eliminate the risk of giving away the positions from which the missiles are fired. The new CL-20 propellant is shock-insensitive (hazard class 1.3) as opposed to current HMX smokeless propellants which are highly detonable (hazard class 1.1). CL-20 is considered a major breakthrough in solid rocket propellant technology but has yet to see widespread use because costs remain high.

=== Electric solid propellants ===
Electric solid propellants (ESPs) are a family of high performance plastisol solid propellants that can be ignited and throttled by the application of electric current. Unlike conventional rocket motor propellants that are difficult to control and extinguish, ESPs can be ignited reliably at precise intervals and durations. It requires no moving parts and the propellant is insensitive to flames or electrical sparks.

== Hobby and amateur/model rocketry ==
Solid propellant rocket motors can be bought for use in model rocketry; they are normally small cylinders of black powder fuel with an integral nozzle and optionally a small charge that is set off when the propellant is exhausted after a time delay. This charge can be used to trigger a camera or deploy a parachute. Without this charge and delay, the motor may ignite a second stage (black powder only).

In amateur rocketry, "candy" propellants are common because they offer relative safety and ease of production, ingredients that are readily available publicly, and a higher specific impulse than blackpowder motors.

In mid- and high-power rocketry, commercially made APCP motors are widely used. They can be designed as either single-use or reloadables. These motors are available in impulse ranges from "A" (1.26 Ns– 2.50 Ns) to "O" (20.48 kNs – 40.96 kNs), from several manufacturers. They are manufactured in standardized diameters and varying lengths depending on required impulse. Standard motor diameters are 13, 18, 24, 29, 38, 54, 75, 98, and 150 millimeters. Different propellant formulations are available to produce different thrust profiles, as well as special effects such as colored flames, smoke trails, or large quantities of sparks (produced by adding titanium sponge to the mix).

== Use ==
=== Sounding rockets ===
Almost all sounding rockets use solid motors.

- Astrobee
- Black Brant
- S-310, S-520
- Skylark (rocket)
- Terrier-Orion, Terrier-Malemute
- VSB-30

=== Missiles ===
Due to reliability, ease of storage and handling, solid rockets are used on missiles and ICBMs.

- Air-to-air missiles: AIM-9 Sidewinder, AIM-54 Phoenix, Fakour-90, Meteor, R-33, PL-15
- Ballistic missiles: Jericho, Sejjil, 9K720 Iskander, Fateh-110, ATACMS, DF-21
- ICBMs: LGM-30 Minuteman, UGM-133 Trident II, LGM-118 Peacekeeper, RT-2PM Topol, DF-41, M51 SLBM

=== Orbital rockets ===
Solid rockets are suitable for launching small payloads to orbital velocities, especially if three or more stages are used. Many of these are based on repurposed ICBMs.

- Scout
- Athena
- Mu
- Pegasus
- Taurus
- Minotaur
- Start-1
- PSLV - alternating solid and liquid stages
- SSLV - all lower 3 stages are solid stages
- SFDR
- Shavit
- Vega
- Long March 11
- OmegA (project was cancelled in 2020, rocket unflown)
- Qaem 100
- Gravity-1

Gravity-1 is the largest-payload-capacity rocket to get into orbit with only solid rocket motors.

Larger liquid-fueled orbital rockets often use solid rocket boosters to gain enough initial thrust to launch the fully fueled rocket.

- Delta II
- Titan IV
- Space Shuttle
- Space Launch System
- Ariane 5
- Atlas II
- Atlas V (optionally 1–5 boosters)
- Delta IV (optionally 2 or 4 boosters)
- H-IIA, H-IIB
- PSLV - optional solid boosters to lift heavier payloads
- GSLV Mk III

Solid fuel is also used for some upper stages, particularly the Star 37 (sometimes referred to as the "Burner" upper stage) and the Star 48 (sometimes referred to as the "Payload Assist Module", or PAM), both manufactured originally by Thiokol, and today by Northrop Grumman. They are used to lift large payloads to intended orbits (such as the Global Positioning System satellites), or smaller payloads to interplanetary—or even interstellar—trajectories. Another solid-fuel upper stage, used by the Space Shuttle and the Titan IV, was the Boeing-manufactured Inertial Upper Stage (IUS).

- Pioneer 10 and Pioneer 11 were both sent out of the Solar System by Star 37E upper stages from Atlas-Centaur rockets.
- Voyager 1 and Voyager 2 were both sent out of the Solar System by Star 37E upper stages from Titan IIIE rockets.
- Magellan was sent to Venus on an IUS after being deployed from Space Shuttle Atlantis on STS-30.
- Galileo was sent to Jupiter on an IUS after being deployed from Space Shuttle Atlantis on STS-34.
- Ulysses was sent to Jupiter on an IUS and a Star 48 PAM after being deployed from Space Shuttle Discovery on STS-41. It then was placed in a polar orbit around the Sun following a gravity assist around Jupiter.
- New Horizons was sent out of the Solar System on a Star 48 PAM from an Atlas V rocket.

Some rockets, like the Antares (manufactured by Northrop Grumman), have mandatory solid-fuel upper stages. The Antares rocket uses the Northrop Grumman-manufactured Castor 30 as an upper stage.

== Advanced research ==
- Environmentally sensitive fuel formulations such as ALICE propellant
- Ramjets with solid fuel
- Variable thrust designs based on variable nozzle geometry
- Hybrid rockets that use solid fuel and throttleable liquid or gaseous oxidizer

== See also ==
- Comparison of solid-fuelled orbital launch systems
- Comparison of orbital launch systems
- Comparison of orbital launcher families
- List of canceled launch vehicle designs
- List of missiles
- List of orbital launch systems
- List of sounding rockets
- List of military rockets
- Fireworks
- Pyrotechnic composition
- Intercontinental ballistic missile
- Jetex
- Space Shuttle Solid Rocket Booster
- Crawford burner
- Nano-thermite
- Skyrocket
