= Rocket candy =

Sugar-based rocket propellant

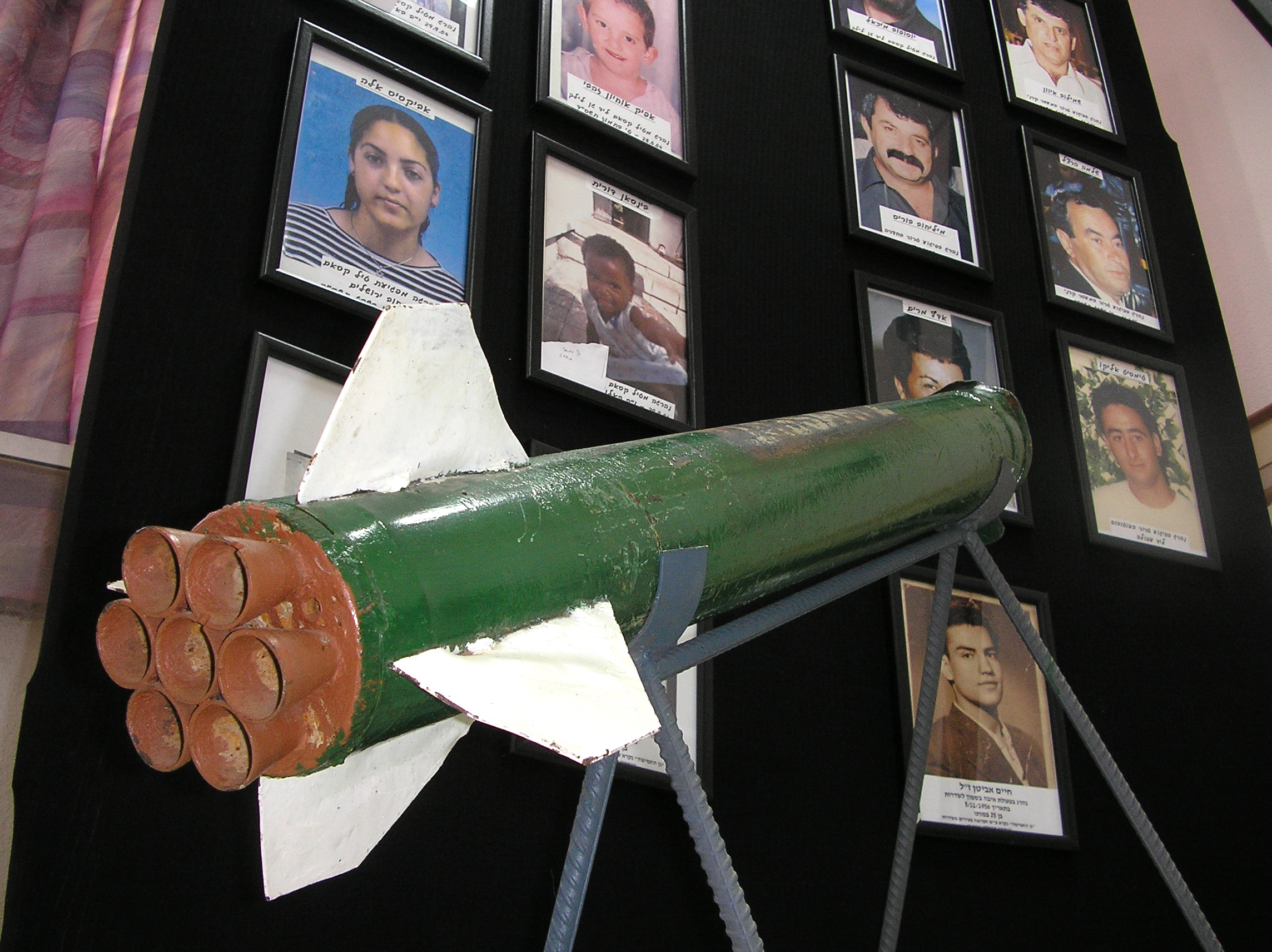
A sugar-powered Qassam rocket, used in war by Hamas.

Rocket candy, or R-Candy, is a type of rocket propellant for model rockets made with a form of sugar as a fuel, and containing an oxidizer. The propellant can be divided into three groups of components: the fuel, the oxidizer, and the (optional) additive(s). In the past, sucrose was most commonly used as fuel. Modern formulations most commonly use sorbitol for its ease of production. The most common oxidizer is potassium nitrate (KNO_{3}), a compound commonly found in tree stump remover. Additives can be many different substances, and either act as catalysts or enhance the aesthetics of the liftoff or flight. A traditional sugar propellant formulation is typically prepared in a 65:35 (13:7) oxidizer to fuel ratio. This ratio can vary from fuel to fuel based on the rate of burn, timing and use.

There are many different methods for preparation of a sugar-based rocket propellant. Dry compression does not require heating; it requires only grinding the components and then packing them into the motor. However, this method is not recommended for serious experimenting, this is because dry compression is less saturated, and can be dangerous if it falls out of the rocket. Dry heating does not actually melt the KNO_{3}, but it melts the sugar and then the KNO_{3} grains become suspended in the sugar. Alternatively, the method of dissolving and heating involves both elements being dissolved in water and then combined by boiling the water off, creating a better mixture.

The total impulse and thrust provided are generally lower for the same amount of fuel than other composite model rocket fuels, but rocket candy is significantly cheaper.

In the United States, rocket candy motors are legal to make, but illegal to transport without a low explosives users permit. Since they count as amateur motors, they are typically launched at sanctioned Tripoli Rocketry Association research launches which require users to hold a Tripoli Rocketry Association high power level 2 certification, however, as long as the mass of the motor is kept under 125 grams, it can still be launched without an FAA flight waiver.

== Components ==
Rocket candy can be broken down into three major groups of components: fuels, oxidizers, and additives. The fuel is the substance that burns, releasing rapidly expanding gases that provide thrust as they exit the nozzle. The oxidizer provides oxygen, which is required for the burning process. The additives can be catalysts, to speed up or make the burning more efficient. However, some additives are more aesthetic, and can add sparks and flames to liftoff, or add smoke for ease of following the rocket in the air.

=== Fuels ===
Many different sugars are used as the fuel for rocket candy. The most common fuel is typically sucrose, however, glucose and fructose are sometimes used. As an alternative, sorbitol, a sugar alcohol commonly used as a sweetener in food, produces a propellant with a slower burn rate and is less brittle when made into propellant grains. Sugars with a double bonded oxygen, such as fructose and glucose, are less thermally stable and tend to caramelize when overheated. Sugars that have alcohol groups, like sorbitol, are much less prone to this decomposition. Some other commonly used sugars include erythritol, xylitol, lactitol, maltitol, or mannitol.

=== Oxidizers ===
The oxidizer most often used in the preparation of sugar motors is potassium nitrate (KNO_{3}). Other oxidizers can be used as well, like nitrates of sodium and calcium, as well as mixtures of sodium + potassium nitrate. KNO_{3} can be acquired through purchasing a granular "stump remover" from stores that carry garden supplies. Other rarely used oxidizers are ammonium and potassium perchlorate.

Two main issues need to be addressed with respect to the oxidizer if one is using potassium nitrate. The most important issue is the purity of the material. If a purchased material does not perform satisfactorily it may be necessary to recrystallize the KNO_{3}. The second important issue with respect to the oxidizer portion of a propellant is its particle size. Most propellant makers prefer their KNO_{3} ground to a small particle size, such as 100 mesh (about 150 μm) or smaller, which can be done using a basic coffee grinder. Rock-tumblers can also be used to mill into a fine grained well mixed powder.

=== Additives ===
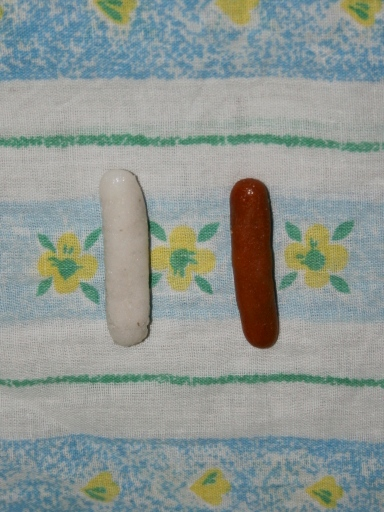
Left is the sample of the basic mixture, right contains 1% of red iron oxide added

Additives are often added to rocket propellants to modify their burn properties. Such additives may be used to increase or decrease the burn rate of the propellant. Some are used to alter the color of the flame or smoke produced. They can also be used to modify a certain physical property of the propellant itself, such as plasticizers or surfactants to facilitate the casting of the formulation. There are many types of experimental additives; the ones listed here are the most commonly used.

Metal oxides have been found to increase the burn rate of sugar propellants. Such additives have been found to function best at levels from 1 to 5 percent. Most often used are iron oxides. Red iron oxide is used most often as it is somewhat easier to obtain than the yellow, brown, or black versions. Brown iron oxide exhibits unusual burn rate acceleration properties under pressure.

Carbon in the form of charcoal, carbon black, graphite, etc; can be and sometimes is used as a fuel in sugar formulations. Most often, however, a small amount of carbon is used as an opacifier, making a visible smoke trail. The carbon acts as a heat sink, keeping a portion of the heat of combustion located in the propellant rather than having it transferred quickly to the motor casing.

If metallic fuels such as aluminum or magnesium are used in a sugar formulation, a danger exists if traces of acids are found in the oxidizer. Acidic materials can react readily with the metal, producing hydrogen and heat, a dangerous combination. The addition of weak bases helps to neutralize these acidic materials, greatly reducing their danger.

Titanium metal in the form of flakes or sponge (about 20 mesh in size) is often added to sugar formulations at levels from 5 to 10% in order to produce a sparking flame and smoke on lift off.

Surfactants are used to reduce the melting viscosity of sugar propellants. For example, propylene glycol helps reduce the melt viscosity of sucrose based propellants.

=== Formulations ===
A typical sugar propellant formulation is typically prepared in a 13:7 oxidizer to fuel ratio (weight ratio). However, this formulation is slightly fuel rich, and can be varied by up to 10%. There are other possible formulations that allow for flight in amateur rocketry.

== Preparation ==
There are a number of different methods for preparing a sugar-based rocket propellant. These methods include dry compression, dry heating, and dissolving and heating. The latter two methods involve heating the propellant.

In dry compression, the sugar and potassium nitrate are individually ground as finely as possible, and then mixed in a ball mill or tumbler to ensure uniform mixing of the components. This mixture is then compressed into the motor tube, similar to the method for packing black powder into a muzzle loading rifle. However, this method is rarely used for serious experiments, and careful safety considerations should be made before deciding to employ this method.

Another, more common, and safer method of preparing a sugar-based rocket propellant is dry heating. First, the potassium nitrate is ground or milled to a fine powder, and then thoroughly mixed with powdered sugar which is then heated. This method does not actually melt the potassium nitrate, as the melting temperature of KNO_{3} is 323 °C (613 °F), but it melts the sugar and coats the grains of KNO_{3} with the melted sugar. An alternative to this method was used by Rick Maschek of the Sugar Shot to Space project. In which he does not grind or mill the potassium nitrate into a powder which results in a viscosity low enough to make the solution pourable when using sorbitol as the fuel for casting grains. The melting process must be performed using a heat spreader, so as to avoid creating autoignition hot-spots.

James Yawn advocates for the dissolving and heating method. Dissolving and heating the propellant actually dissolves both elements of the propellant and combines them. First, the KNO_{3} and sugar are placed in a pot or saucepan. Then, just enough water is added to be able to completely dissolve the KNO_{3} and the sugar. The mixture is then heated and brought to a boil until the water evaporates. The mixture goes through several stages: first boiling, then bubbling and spitting, then its consistency becomes smooth and creamy. There are several advantages to dissolving the sugar and KNO_{3} in water before heating. One advantage is that the KNO_{3} and the sugar do not have to be finely powdered, because they both end up completely dissolved. It can be also be prepared at a lower temperature and requires less stirring. This method of preparation also causes the resultant propellant to resist caramelization in the pot, giving more time to pack it into the motors. A possible negative is that the resultant propellant is a little thicker (more viscous). The mixture is not pourable and requires scooping into a mold, and won’t ever be as thin as the dry heating method.

== Performance ==
Sugar based rocket propellants have an average I_{sp}(specific impulse) of between 114 and 130 seconds. Compare that to the average I_{sp} of an APCP (Ammonium perchlorate composite propellant), which is 180 to 260 seconds. Sorbitol and KNO_{3} based propellants with a typical 35:65 ratio are capable of an I_{sp} of between 110 and 125 seconds. However, sorbitol and KNO_{3} rockets with additives have been recorded as having specific impulses of up to 128 seconds.

Xylitol and KNO_{3} based rocket propellants are capable of a specific impulse of ~100 seconds. These have an unconfined burn rate of about 1.3 mm/s. Dextrose and KNO_{3} based fuels are capable of an I_{sp} of 137 seconds. Overall, the performance characteristics of sugar rockets approach those of professional grade propellants.

== Applications ==
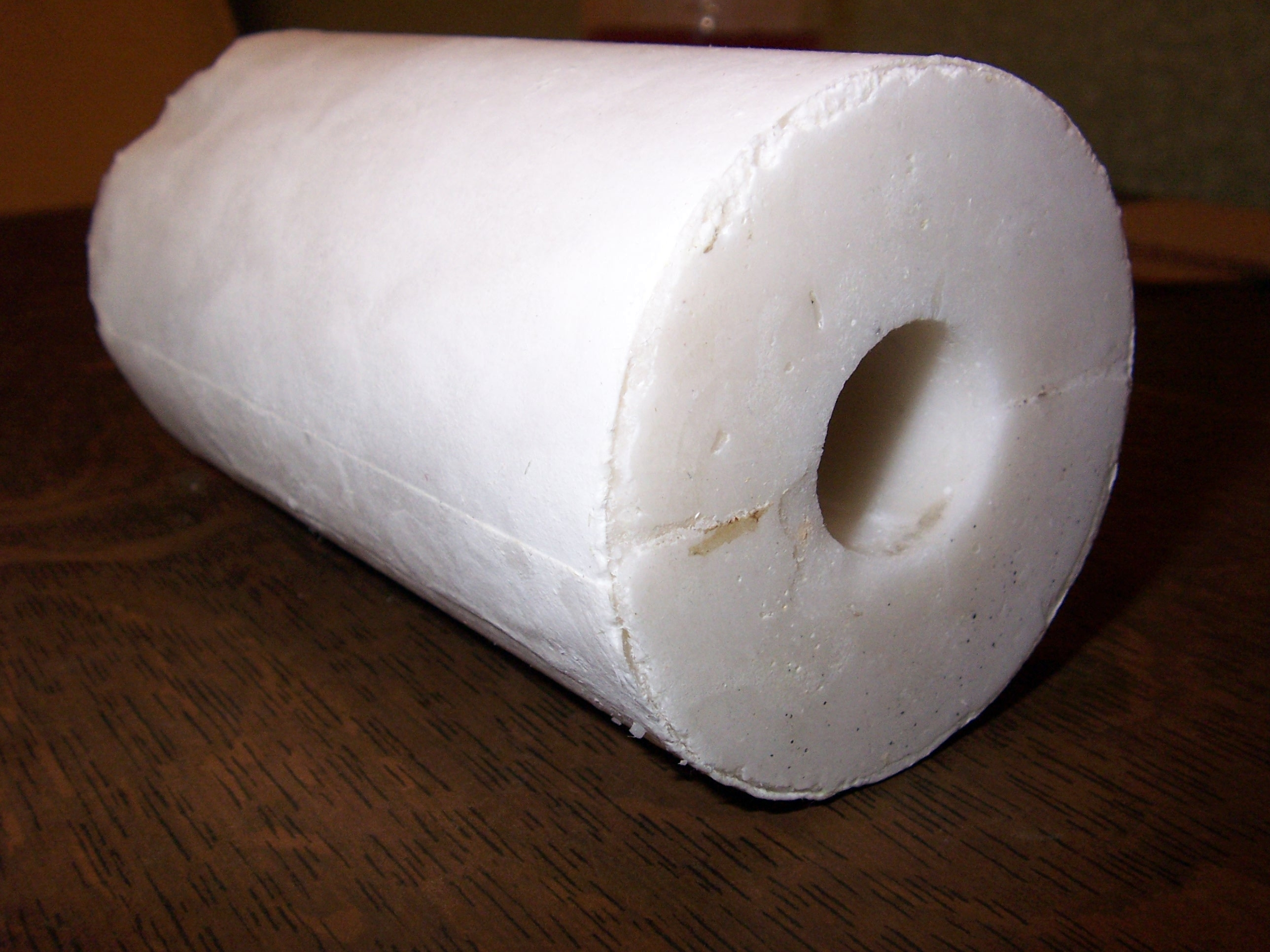
BATES grain of a simple sorbitol mixture

Rocket candy is also occasionally known as "caramel candy", a term that was popularized by Bertrand R. Brinley, in his book on amateur rocketry, Rocket Manual for Amateurs, published in 1960. This propellant was used in some of the amateur rockets described by Homer Hickam in his best-selling memoir Rocket Boys.

Rocket candy was also employed in a small amateur rocket described by Lt. Col. Charles M. Parkin in a lengthy Electronics Illustrated article that continued over several issues, beginning in July 1958. Parkin described how to prepare the propellant mixture by using an electric frying pan as a heat source for the melting operation. This article was reprinted in Parkin's book, The Rocket Handbook for Amateurs, which was published in 1959. Parkin's article contributed to the increasing popularity of the rocket candy propellant among amateur rocket groups beginning in the late 1950s and early 1960s.

Sugar-fueled rockets have been used as crude weapons of war, such as during the attacks on Israel by Hamas during 2000-2003.

The Sugar Shot to Space program (SS2S) was formed with the goal "to loft a rocket powered by a 'sugar propellant' into space" equivalent to 100 kilometres (62 mi) in altitude. The Double Sugar Shot rocket was expected to reach 33 kilometres (21 mi), or one third of the goal altitude. The first Mini Sugar Shot rocket, a single-stage dual-pulse design motor prototype of the Extreme Sugar Shot rocket, reached an altitude of 4 kilometres (2.5 mi) before a catastrophic motor malfunction occurred; contact with the second Mini Sugar Shot rocket was lost at an altitude of nearly 6 kilometres (3.7 mi) going in excess of Mach 1. In 2017 Rick Maschek and Chris Covany of the SS2S team successfully launched their 150mm potassium nitrate sorbitol propellant rocket at over Mach 2.5 and was followed later that same year by Rick and Eric Beckner of the SS2S team with the first of two successful 300mm KNSB motor static motor tests, largest 'sugar' motors ever, at the Friends of Amateur Rocketry (FAR) facility showing large 'sugar' motors could be made. The Extreme Sugar Shot rocket, now planned as a conventional 2-stage rocket design and the rocket expected to meet the goal of entering space, has not yet been completed.

Because of its relatively low performance, sugar rockets are not usually used in professional formats; however, they are a popular choice for amateurs because it is relatively safe and easy to produce, as both sugar and potassium nitrate are readily available, as food products and tree stump remover, respectively.

== See also ==
- Black powder rocket motor
- Sugar Shot to Space
