= Barbara McGuire =

Barbara McGuire may refer to:

- Barbara McGuire (artist), American artist
- Barbara McGuire (politician), American politician from Arizona
