= Sugar Shot to Space =

Amateur rocketry project

Sugar Shot to Space is a volunteer project with the stated goal of launching a rocket into space (100 km) powered by rocket candy, a sugar-based fuel. As of 2015, a paper in the International Journal of Engineering Trends and Applications stated that the "Double Sugar Shot" rocket had reached 33 km, but the article did not provide telemetry or supporting references for this claim.

A successful flight would not be the first time an amateur group has launched a rocket into space (which occurred in 2004), but would be the first rocket to reach space using a sugar-based fuel.
