= Carol Duvall =

American television personality (1926–2023)

- Born: Carol-Jean Reihmer; January 10, 1926; Milwaukee, Wisconsin, U.S.
- Died: July 31, 2023 (aged 97); Traverse City, Michigan, U.S.
- Education: Michigan State University
- Occupation: Television personality
- Spouse: Carl Duvall (m. 1945, divorced)
- Children: 2

Carol-Jean Duvall (née Reihmer; January 10, 1926 – July 31, 2023) was an American television personality known for hosting arts and crafts-themed programming. After beginning her career on local television in Michigan, she gradually rose to national prominence. From 1994 to 2005, she hosted The Carol Duvall Show, which aired on HGTV and later on the DIY Network.

== Early life ==
Carol-Jean Reihmer was born in Milwaukee on January 10, 1926, and raised in Grand Rapids, Michigan. She married Carl Duvall in 1945; they had two sons and later divorced. Duvall graduated from Michigan State University.

== Career ==
Duvall's television career began on a children's show in Grand Rapids in 1951. A local radio station bought a television station and she and a friend decided to go and audition. The station liked what they had to offer and Duvall was hired. By the end of the first year, she was doing seventeen live shows a week. In 1962 the manager of the station moved to WWJ-TV in Detroit and hired Duvall to work there. She spent 18 years in a variety of positions, ranging from news anchor to co-producer and host of her first craft-oriented program, "Here's Carol Duvall".

One day she received a call from a man she had met when he was still an intern in Cleveland. He was putting together a new show called the Home Show and they needed a craft person. The show was picked up by ABC and ran for six years.

When the Home Show came to an end in 1994, the host Robb Weller formed a production company with Gary Grossman which developed The Carol Duvall Show. The program ran on HGTV from 1994 until 2005, then on DIY Network from 2005 until the end of 2009.

== Death ==
Duvall died at a retirement home in Traverse City, Michigan, on July 31, 2023, at the age of 97.

== Publications ==
- Wanna Make Something Out of It? (1972), Nash Publishing ISBN 0-8402-1277-1
- Paper Crafting with Carol Duvall (2007), DRG Publishing ISBN 1-59635-142-X
- Art Unscripted, An artist retreat hosted by Carol Duvall (2008) DVD, directed by Suzanne Lamar

== Filmography ==
- Home (1988–1993)
- The Carol Duvall Show (1994–2005)
- Carol Duvall's Holiday Workshop (2001)
