= BATES =

System for measuring solid rocket propellant performance

BATES is an acronym for BAllistic Test and Evaluation System, which is a standardized system for measuring solid rocket propellant performance designed and developed by the United States Air Force Research Laboratory in 1959 through the early 1960s, used for almost forty years thereafter, and again beginning in 2010. Then through 2016. According to this reference, a single propellant grain weighing 68 to 70 pounds was used in the original AFRL BATES motor design. An AFRL BATES propellant grain is inhibited, usually by a flame resistant cartridge case, on the OD, burning only on the two outer ends and the central bore, and is dimensioned so the burning area does not change significantly (< 3% in the original BATES motor) through the burn, generating a flat-topped thrust curve (neutral burn) to minimize propellant characterization costs and simplify the data analysis.

The first official description of the BATES system was published by and available from the Defense Technical Information Center (DTIC): “Development and Evaluation of the USAF Ballistic Test Evaluation System for Solid Rocket Propellants”.

An official press release in 1964 included BATES information.

In 2016 the AIR FORCE published through DTIC an overview that included a summary of BATES use.

In modern usage, BATES often refers to a type of solid-fuel rocket motor grain geometry. A BATES grain consists of one or more cylindrical grain segments with the outer surface inhibited, but free to burn both on the segment ends and the cylindrical core. Such grains are very easy to cast, while allowing for the user to configure a progressive, regressive, or neutral thrust curve by changing various dimensions. The neutral BATES length is calculated by the equation $L = \frac{1}{2}(3D_g+d_c)$, where $L$ is the length of the grain, $D_g$ is the outer diameter of the grain, and $d_c$ is the diameter of the core of the grain.
