= Polymer clay =

PVC-based hardenable modeling clay

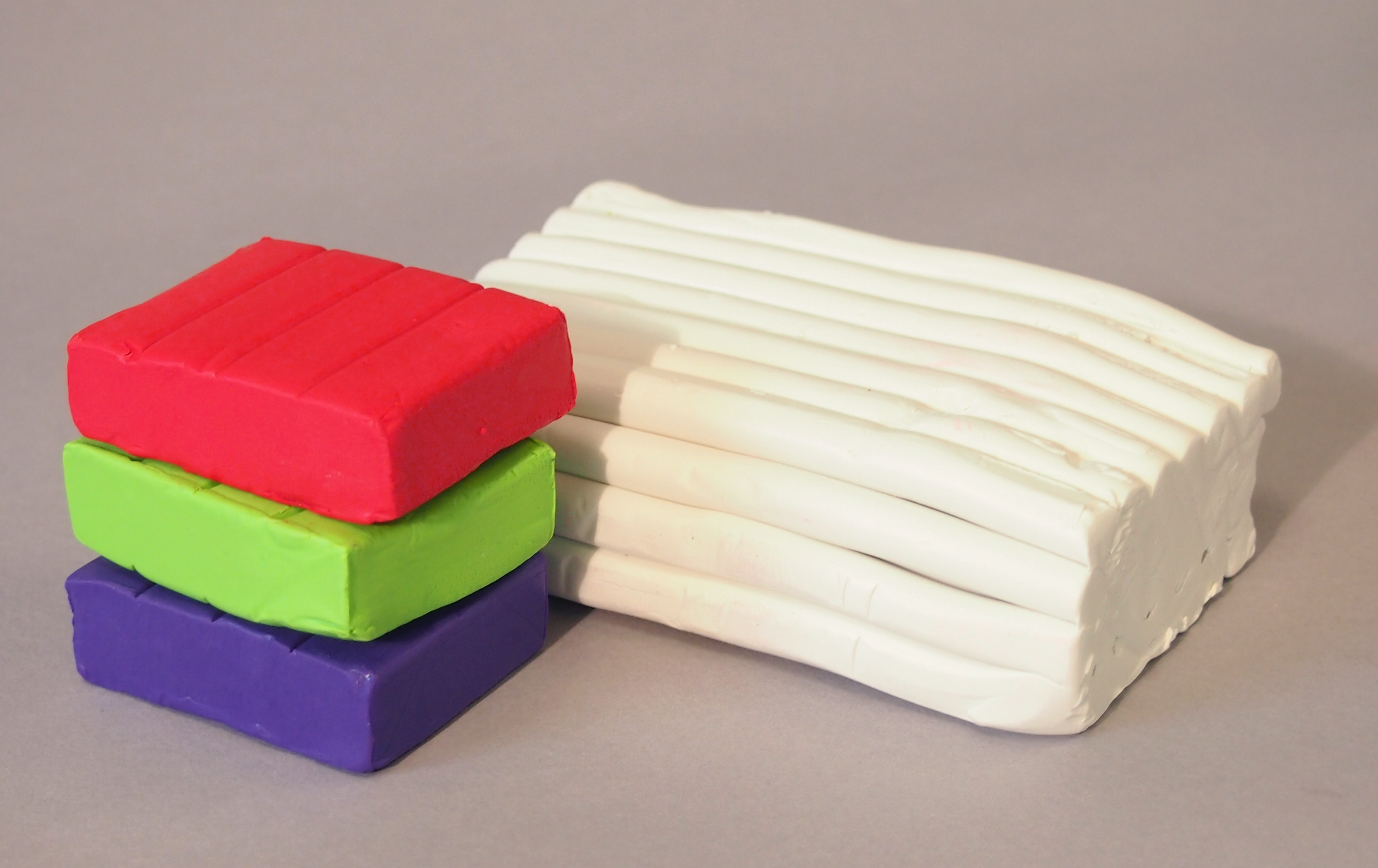
Two-ounce and one-pound blocks of polymer clay.

Polymer clay is a type of hardenable modeling clay based on the polymer polyvinyl chloride (PVC). It typically contains no clay minerals, but like mineral clay, a liquid is added to dry particles until it achieves gel-like working properties. Similarly, the part is put into an oven to harden, hence its colloquial designation as clay. Polymer clay is generally used for making arts and craft items, and is also used in commercial applications to make decorative parts. Art made from polymer clay can now be found in major museums.

== History ==
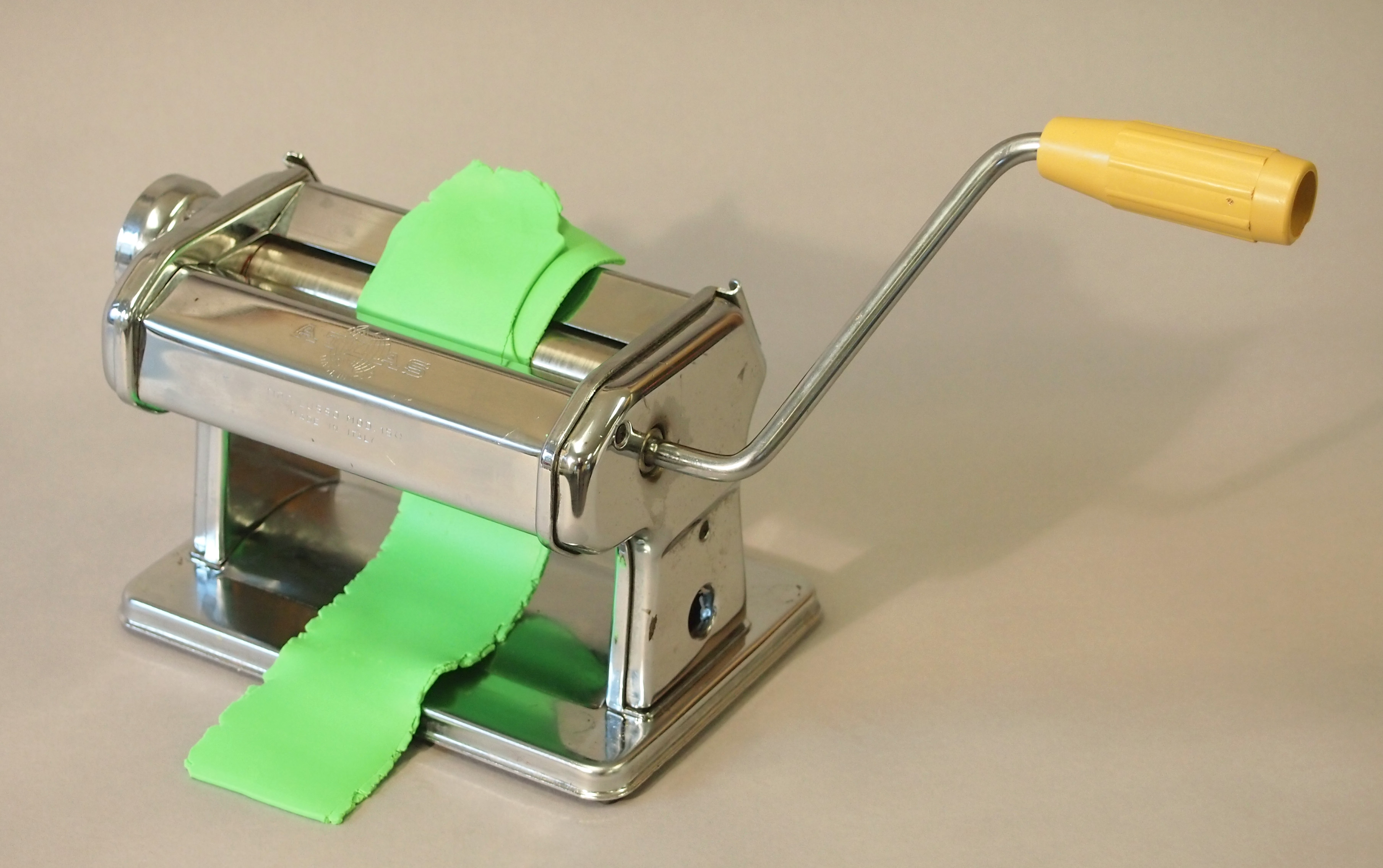
Pasta-making machine conditioning polymer clay.

Bakelite, an early plastic, was popular with designers and was an early form of polymer clay, but the phenol base of uncured Bakelite was flammable and was eventually discontinued. Polymer clays were first formulated as a possible replacement for Bakelite. One of these formulations was brought to the attention of German doll maker Käthe Kruse in 1939. While it was not suitable for use in her factory, Kruse gave some to her daughter Sophie, who was known in the family as "Fifi", who successfully used it as modeling clay. The formulation was later sold to Eberhard Faber and marketed under the name "FIMO" (FIfi's MOdeling compound).

== Composition ==
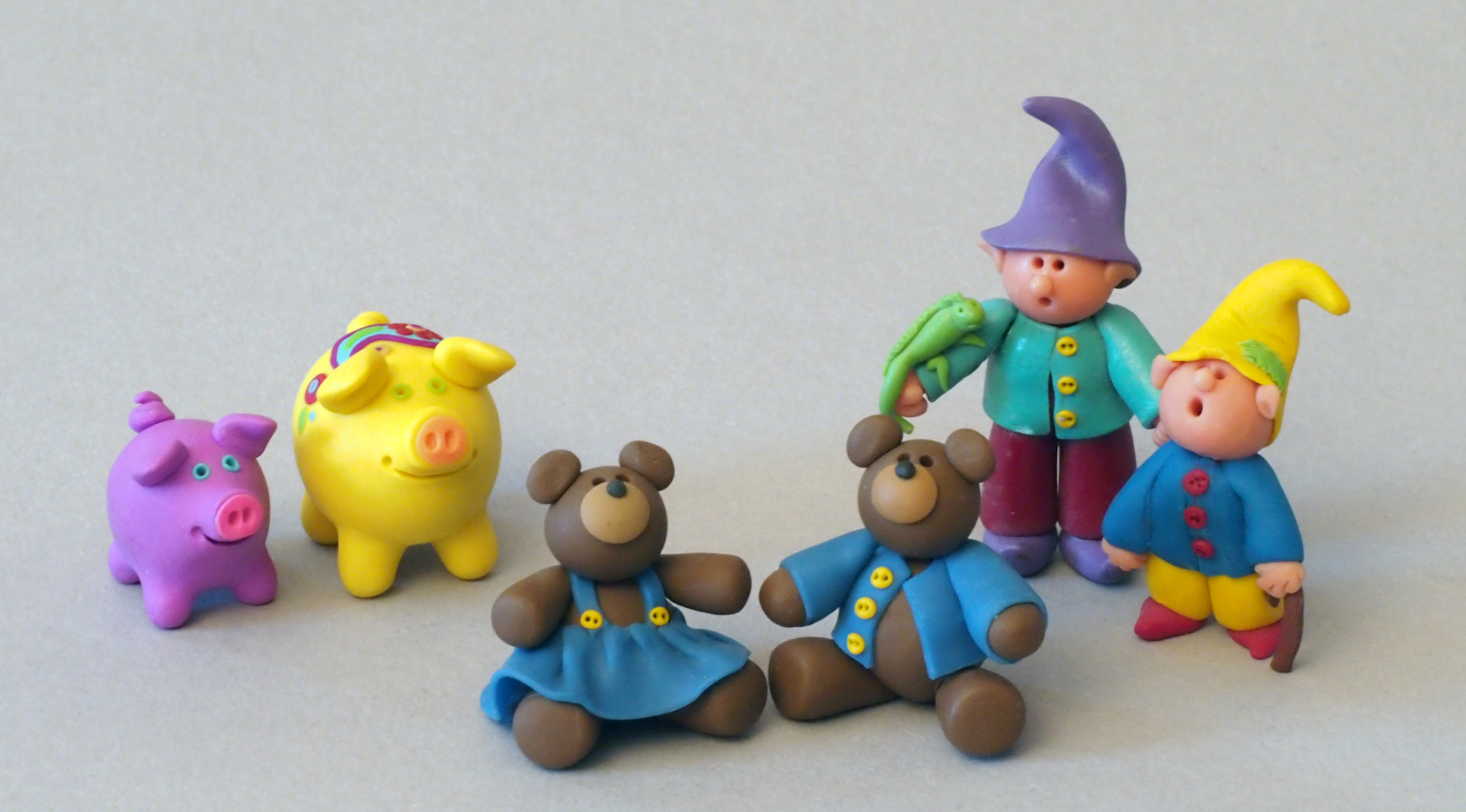
Figurines made from polymer clay.

Polymer clays contain a basis of PVC resin and a liquid plasticizer, making it a plastisol. Polymer clay plastisol is also categorized as a plastigel because of its rheological properties. It is a high yield thixotropic material: when a sufficient force is applied, the material yields, flowing like a viscous liquid until that force is removed, whereupon it returns to being a solid. This plasticity is what makes it useful as modeling clay as opposed to putty or paste. Plastigels retain their shape even when heat is applied, which is why polymer clay does not melt or droop when oven cured. Various gelling agents are added to give it this property, such as aminated bentonite, metallic soaps, or fumed silica.

The base resin can be modified in various ways. Mineral oil, lecithin, and odorless mineral spirits can be added to reduce its viscosity or alter its working properties. Small amounts of zinc oxide, kaolin, or other fillers are sometimes added to increase opacity, elastic modulus, or compression strength. Polymer clay is available in many colors, which can be mixed to create a wide range of colors or gradient blends. Special-effect colors and composites include translucent, fluorescent, phosphorescent, and faux "pearls", "metallics", and "stone."

== Use ==
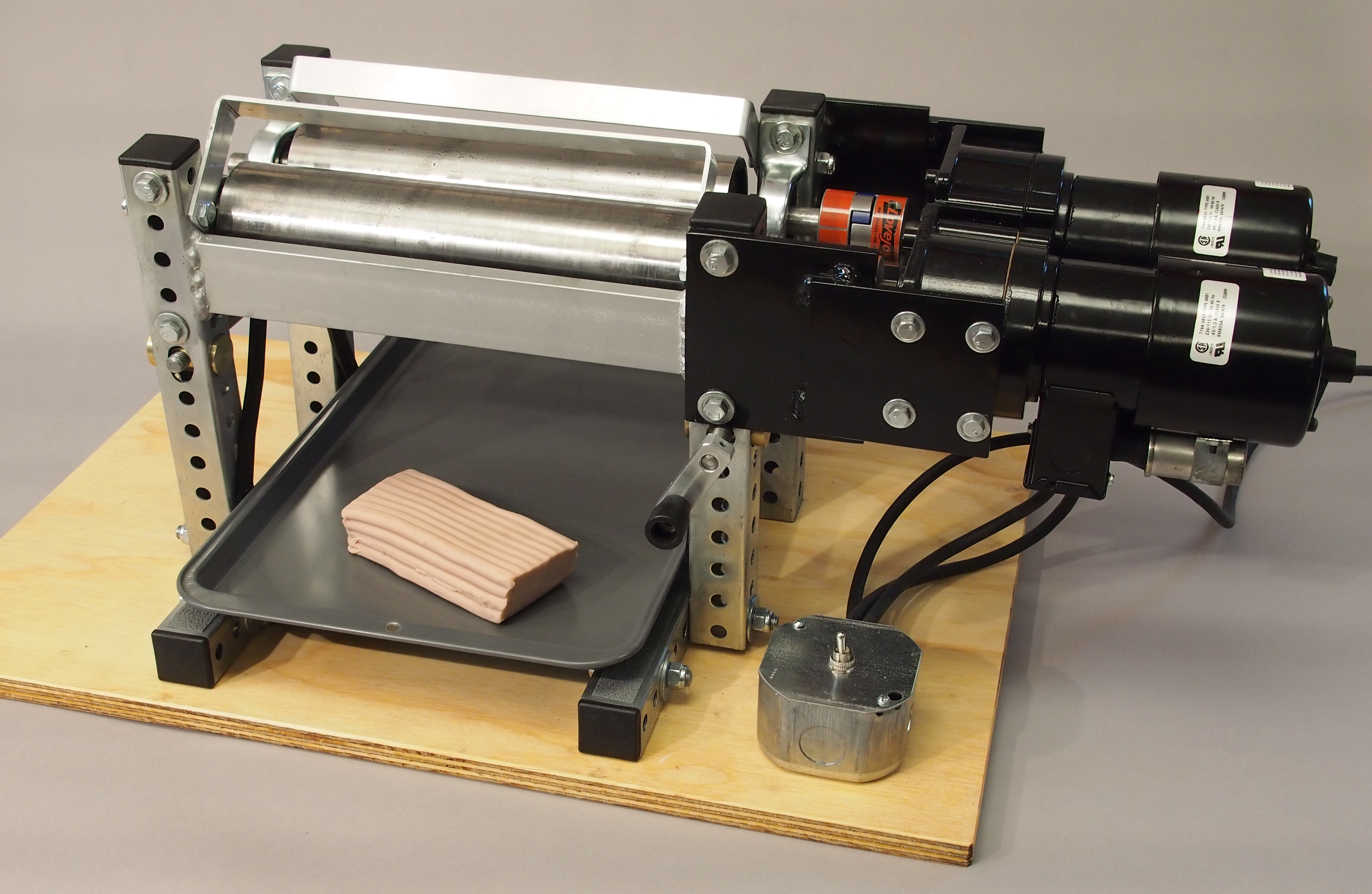
Custom built clay conditioner for industrial use.

Polymer clay remains workable until cured. Curing occurs at temperatures from 265 °F (129 °C) to 275 °F (135 °C) sustained for 15 minutes per 1/4 inch (6.4 mm) of thickness. This temperature is significantly less than for mineral clays and can be achieved using a home oven. Professional polymer clay brands shrink very little when cured Brands of polymer clay include Cernit, Oytra, Fimo, Kato Polyclay, Sculpey, PVClay Brasil, Crafty Argentina and Cosclay.

A home pasta-making machine is a popular multi-purpose tool for polymer clay artists. It is used to create sheets of uniform thickness, to mix colors or create variegated sheets, and to condition (soften) the clay. Polymer clay generally needs to be conditioned before use. This involves kneading the clay by hand, passing it between two rollers, or using a low-shear mixer to break up any resin particle adhesions. Once conditioned, the clay will remain pliable until the particles eventually re-adhere.

Oven-hardenable PVC plastisol, "liquid polymer clay," is a complement to polymer clay that can be used as an adhesive to combine pieces, or to create various effects. Pigments, chalk pastel, and regular polymer clay can be added to make colored liquid clay. The liquid can also be poured into molds to produce cast parts.

== Health and safety ==
Polymer clay safety is the subject of concern specifically regarding the long-term effects of exposure to certain phthalate plasticizers that have been classified as endocrine disruptors. When used as a toy or child care item, in the United States, it should not contain more than 0.1% of any of the six phthalates restricted or banned by the safety regulatory board according to the Consumer Product Safety Improvement Act (CPSIA). These six phthalates are: DEHP (Di-2-ethylhexyl phthalate), DBP (Dibutyl phthalate), BBP (Benzyl butyl phthalate), DINP (Di-isononyl phthalate), DIDP (Di-isodecyl phthalate), and DnOP (Di-n-octyl phthalate). If the instructions on the package are followed (i.e. low temperatures and brief baking times) one will not burn the clay. If the clay does burn because of a mistake or if the oven malfunctions, a small amount of hydrogen chloride gas could be released, which may cause odor and some eye or nose irritation. The amount of hydrogen chloride gas released from the clay could cause a health problem.

Due to the testing requirements and regulations, clay products that would be used to hold or serve food or beverages are not recommended or intended for these applications. Plasticizers remain in the cured product and can leach out, making it a potential health hazard for both the modeler and end user. Restrictions on use of certain phthalates took effect in 2009 in both the European Union and United States. Not all phthalates pose a health hazard and some are approved for medical applications.
