= Burn rate (chemistry) =

Measure of the linear combustion rate of a substance

In chemistry, the burn rate (or burning rate) is a measure of the linear combustion rate of a compound or substance such as a candle or a solid propellant. It is measured in length over time, such as millimeters per second or inches per second. Among the variables affecting burn rate are pressure and temperature. Burn rate is an important parameter, especially in propellants, because it determines the rate at which exhaust gases are generated from the burning propellant, which decides the flow rate through the nozzle. The thrust generated in the rocket of a missile depends on this flow rate. Thus, knowing the burn rate of a propellant and how it changes under various conditions is of fundamental importance in the successful design of a solid rocket motor. The concept of burn rate is also relevant in case of liquid propellants.

== Measurement ==
One device for measuring the burning rate is a V-shaped metal channel about 1–2 feet long wherein a sample is placed, with a cross-sectional dimension of approximately 6 mm or 1/4 in. The sample is ignited on one end, and time is measured until the flame front reaches the other. Burn rate (typically expressed in mm/s or in/s) is the sample length over time at a given pressure and temperature. For solid fuel propellant, the most common method of measuring burn rate is the Crawford Type Strand Burning Rate Bomb System (also known as the Crawford Burner or Strand Burner), as described in MIL-STD-286C.

== Characterization ==
A substance is characterized by a burn rate vs. pressure chart and burn rate vs temperature chart.

- Higher burn rate than the speed of sound in the material (usually several km/s): "detonation"
- A few meters per second: "deflagration"
- A few centimeters per second: "burn" or "smolder"
- 0.01 mm/s to 100 mm/s: "decomposing rapidly" to characterise it.

However, there is a difference in opinion in differentiating the three in the absence of firm numbers at a given pressure or temperature.

== See also ==
- Detonation velocity
