= Crawford burner =

Solid rocket fuel burn rate tester

A Crawford burner is a device used to test burn rate of solid propellants under different high-pressure conditions. It is also known as a Crawford bomb, Crawford strand burner, or strand burner.

A Crawford burner consists of a small pressure vessel in which a thin bar of propellant to be tested is mounted on a stand. The bar is coated with an external coating so that burning cross-sectional surface is restricted. The propellant is ignited at one end and burned to the other end. Wires are embedded in the propellant at certain intervals of distance so that when the propellant burning reaches the wire, it sends off electrical signals. These wires are connected to a chronometer and the electrical signals are recorded at different time intervals so that burning rate can be measured.

The pressure vessel is usually filled with an inert gas like nitrogen to a high pressure, between 1 and ~100 atm.

The burning rate measured from a strand burner is typically 4 to 12% less than actual burning rate observed in rockets. This is because the high temperature conditions in actual rockets are not simulated. The heat transfer characteristics are also different. Nevertheless, the strand burner experiment is easy to perform, can be repeated, and gives a qualitative relation of the burning rate to the pressure. While not directly measured, the temperature sensitivity of burning rate is usually calculated from data obtained from the strand burner test.

== See also ==
- Solid rocket
