= Sculpey =

Polymer clay brand

A block of Sculpey

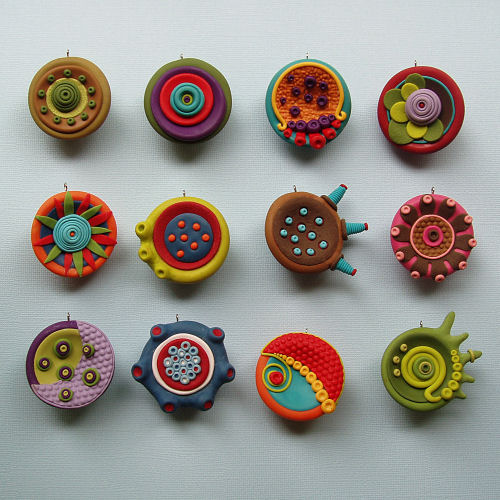
Figurines made of Sculpey

Sculpey (often misspelled as Sculpy) is the brand name for a type of polymer clay that can be modeled and put into a conventional oven to harden, as opposed to typical modeling clays, which require a much hotter oven, such as a kiln. Until it is baked, Sculpey has a consistency somewhat like Plasticine. Its main competitor is the German brand Fimo. It is sold in many colors, but can also be painted once it’s baked. Sculpey has become popular with modeling artists, jewellery makers, and other craft work.

The primary ingredient in Sculpey is polyvinyl chloride, augmented with fillers, plasticizers and colorants. Aside from the hazards of overheating and combustion, which can generate hydrochloric acid and other toxins, Sculpey is nontoxic both before and after hardening.

== History ==
Sculpey is a brand of polymer clay made by Polyform Products in the United States. The compound was first created in the early 1960s, with the original idea being to use the clay as a thermal transfer compound which would conduct heat away from the cores of electrical transformers. However, the usage of the compound for this purpose turned out to be unsuccessful. The material was neglected for a period of time, until the late 1960s, when it was discovered that the compound could be molded, baked, sanded, drilled, carved and painted. It became a highly versatile medium for the craft industry. The clay was marketed directly to people at craft shows, street fairs and demonstrations in small art stores.

Sculpey closely resembles Fimo, another brand of polymer clay. Sculpey has a less rigid composition which better suits modeling, while Fimo is better suited for twisting into cane and bead making because the colors do not blend together as readily. The plasticity is controlled by the amount of oil suspending the polymers in the "clay".

Today, Sculpey offers six variations of polymer clay: Sculpey Soufflé, Sculpey Premo, Sculpey III, Sculpey BakeShop, Super Sculpey and Sculpey Original. It also manufactures various liquid clay products and polymer clay tools.

== Techniques ==
Many techniques exist for working with polymer clay. Caning is a technique borrowed from glass artisans, who used the name millefiori, meaning "a thousand flowers". It involves making a picture from thick pieces of polymer clay, which are then extruded so the picture becomes smaller, and the cane much longer. The original picture can then be seen running throughout the length of the cane, though smaller. It can then be sliced, with the slices used to cover other objects or blobs of scrap polymer clay.

Marbling is one of the simplest techniques used with polymer clay. It involves mixing different colors of polymer clay together to form a pattern. As the clay is mixed, the pattern becomes smaller and smaller, until the two colors are completely blended.

Colors can be mixed by combining various colors of clay, alcohol inks, mica powder or paints.

Mokume-Gane is a technique borrowed from metalworking. It involves placing several sheets of clay on top of each other and then pushing an object through it.
