= Fimo =

Brand of polymer clay

Creating a cookie out of Fimo

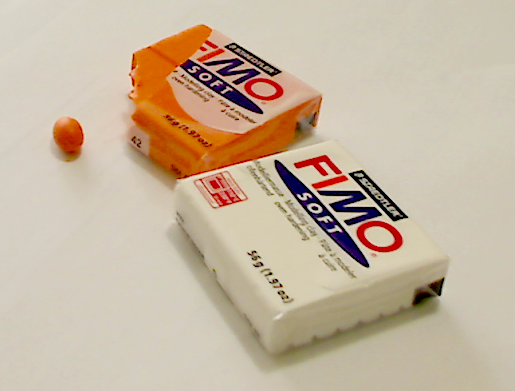
Fimo blocks

Fimo is a brand of polymer clay made by German company Staedtler (STAEDTLER Mars GmbH & Co. KG). Fimo is sold worldwide. Its main U.S. competitor is the American brand Sculpey. The material comes in many different colors; there are many finishes to choose from, and even a softener to use with it because it can be hard to work. It is used for making many objects, including jewelry, accessories, and small ornaments. Once shaped, Fimo is baked in a standard or toaster oven for about 30 minutes at 110 °C (230 °F) to harden it. Once baked, it can be cut, drilled, painted, sanded, and sliced thinly. According to information from Staedtler, Fimo contains polyvinyl chloride (PVC), but has not contained any phthalates since 2006.

== History ==
FIMO was first a plastic modeling compound brought to the attention of German dollmaker Käthe Kruse in 1939 as a possible replacement for plastic compounds. It was not suitable for her doll factory use, and she turned it over to her daughter Sophie Rehbinder-Kruse, who was known in the family as "Fifi" (hence FIMO, from Fifi's Modeling Compound). The brand was later sold to Eberhard Faber and is marketed under the name "FIMO".

== Techniques ==
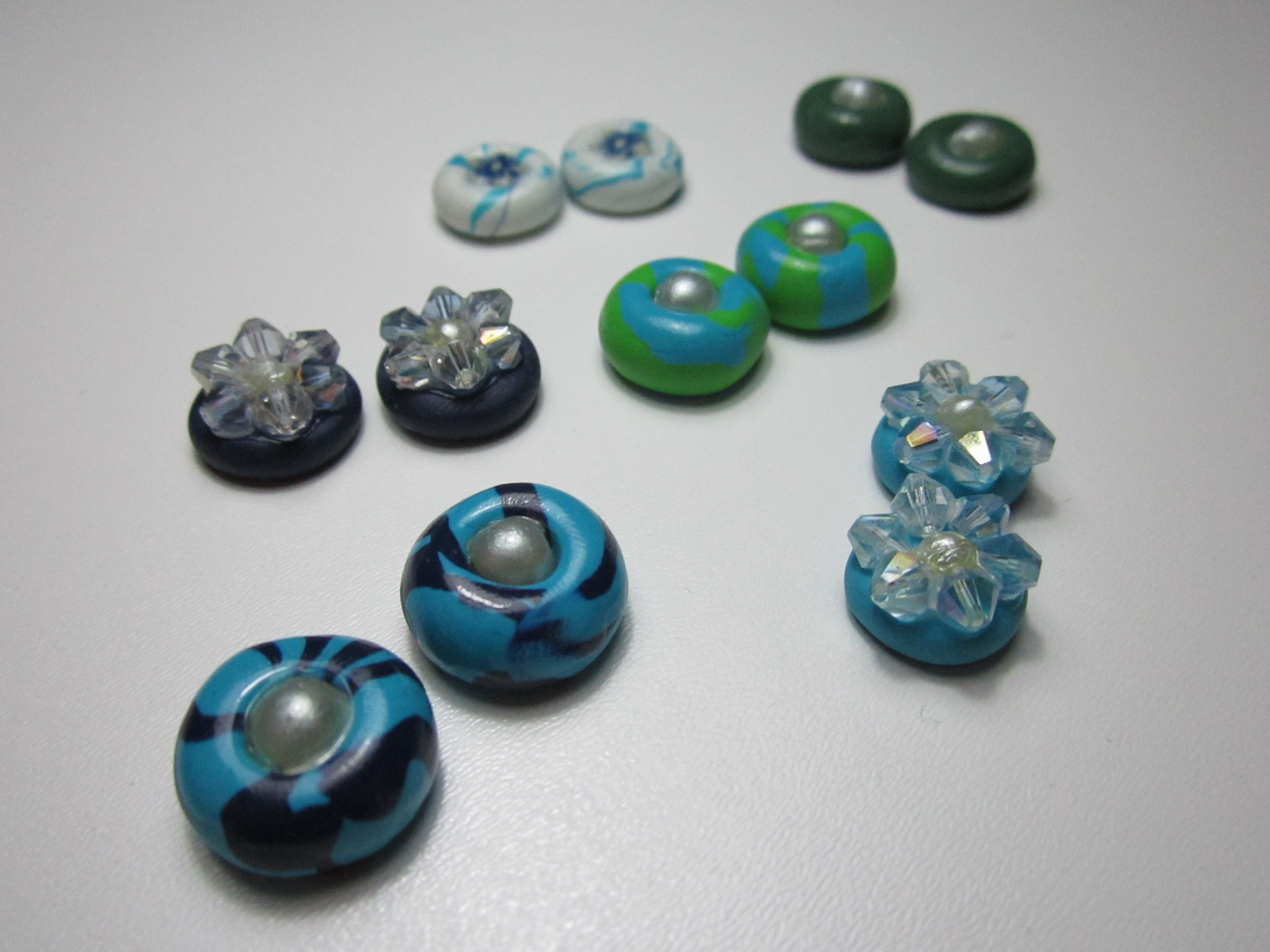
Sets of earrings made of fimo

Fimo and other polymer clay products can be worked in a variety of techniques:

Sculpting
Fimo can be sculpted in ways similar to other modeling materials such as ceramic, modelling clay, and Play-Doh.

Sculptures can have glass beads and wire added before curing to provide additional detailing. Artists may also use armature wire to support their sculptures. Aluminum foil can be used to prop up large areas, where the foil is scrunched into a shape and then layered with Fimo. It is also possible to use glass objects as a base structure point to build up from.

Marbling and color mixing
Because Fimo is packaged in colored blocks, the colors can be mixed while soft, then baked. By mixing two or more colors, then twisting, folding, bending, and cutting, assorted marbled surfaces can be obtained.

If multiple colors are mixed thoroughly enough, the marble effect will fade and the colors will blend to make a new color.

Caning
Caning or caneworking, also known as millefiori, draws from a traditional glass technique where a two dimensional design is constructed in three dimensions, with the different colored elements of the design extending all the way through the form from the front surface to the back surface. Once the initial form is completed, the form, known as a "cane," can be sliced (with the blade held parallel to the front surface) to produce a number of nearly identical copies of the design. Additionally, the form can be extended by squeezing or rolling the sides so that the form becomes longer from front to back, while becoming narrower in the other two dimensions. When the resulting form is sliced, the original design will be preserved, but lessen to a smaller size. This technique also allows a larger number of slices to be extracted from the same amount of clay. In glass work, the type of the material dictates that these be round, but with polymer clay the shapes can be more varied, although round and square canes are the most common because they are easiest to extend. Cylinders can be rolled out to a longer length very easily, while cubic forms can be squeezed on their four side surfaces. More complex shapes such as hexagons can be worked with, but it is difficult to extend complex shapes without distortion.
Bull's eye cane
The process used to create "lacework" with Polymer clay. This refers to a single color roll of Polymer clay, which is then wrapped in a secondary color. Rolling and compressing the two colors to make a perfect join is a known as a "bull's eye". Cutting this length of clay into even lengths and laying them on top of each other and re-rolling forms lacework.
Beading
Polymer clay can be formed into beads or charms, with the holes punched before baking or drilled in afterwards.
Polishing
Using 400-600 Wet and Dry Sandpaper, an artist can sand their project to create an extremely smooth polished effect. Whilst sanding, a small amount of water should be run over the cured project until desired effect is achieved. A hand-held drill such as a "Dremel" can also be used on a low-speed setting with a buffer pad, to create a more highly polished design.
Mixed Media
Polymer clay also works well with Embossing Powders. Mixing them into Fimo clay can create a metallic marble effect. Glitter foil, powders, alcohol inks or fragments can be mixed in to create attractive effects when using the Fimo Translucent colors.

== Surface treatments ==
Lacquer
Staedtler produced and sold Fimo-branded glossy lacquer, it has now been discontinued. The lacquers are thick liquids applied after baking. They dry to a hard finish that protects the clay as well as changing the surface texture. A matte finish lacquer was available for some portion of the 1980s and 1990s, but it has also been discontinued.
Metallic powders
Staedtler produces and sells a number of Fimo-branded metallic powders for surface application.
Paint
Fimo can be painted. Acrylic paints are best as oil based may not dry completely.

== Versions ==
Since the original product, Staedtler has introduced new forms of Fimo, causing the Fimo of the early 1990s to be sometimes called "classic" Fimo. Fimo Soft is easier to condition but not as strong as the original classic Fimo.

== Safety standards ==
Fimo conforms to the European Standard EN 71 part 5 and resembles the ACMI-Seal AP "non toxic" since 2018.
