= Homebuilt machines =

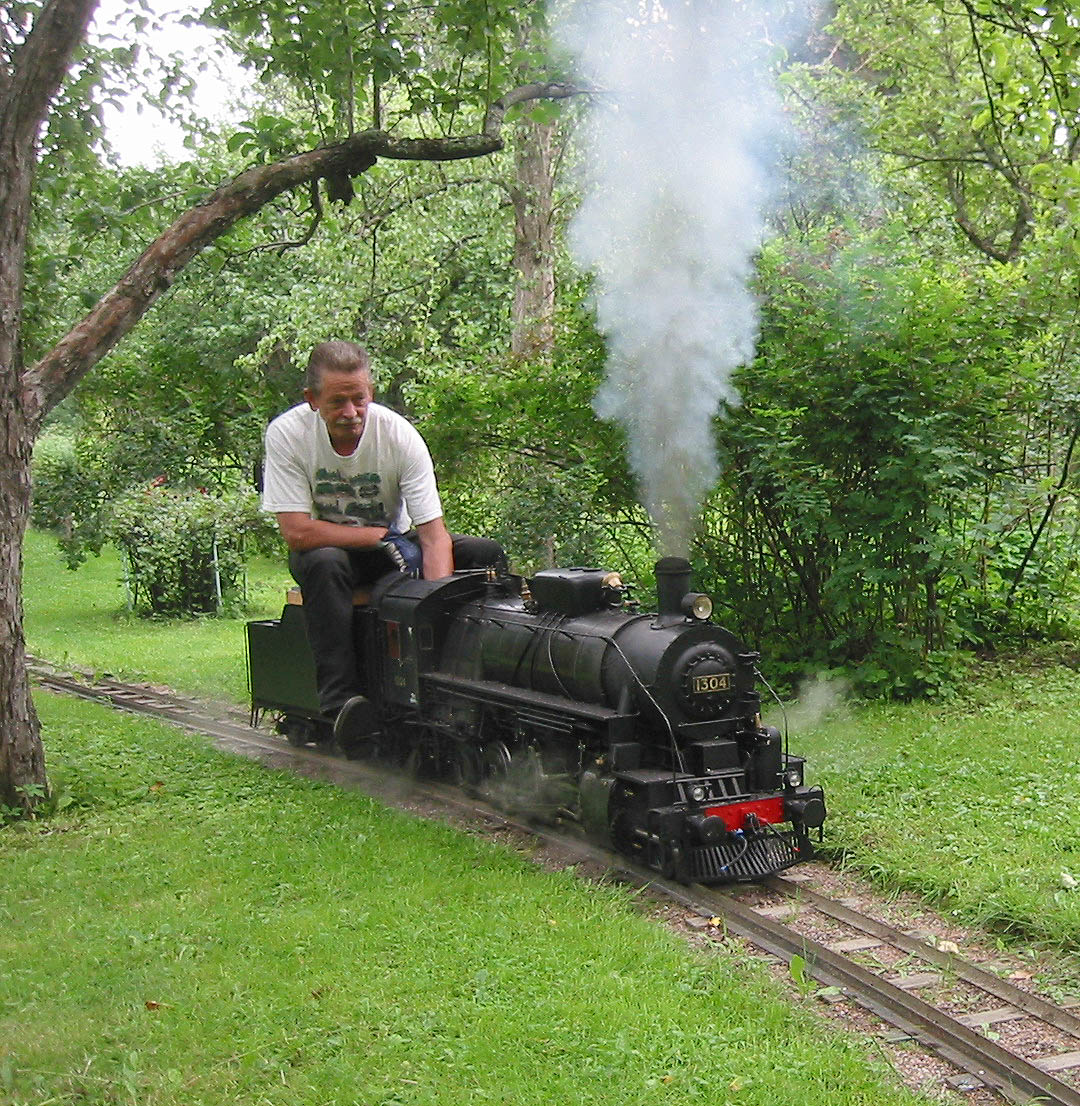
A hand-crafted, coal-fired, 1:8 scale 2-10-0 'live steam' locomotive in 7 1/4 in (184 mm) gauge, built in 14,000 hours over a period of 15 years.

Homebuilt machines are machines built outside of specialised workshops or factories. This can include different things such as kit cars or homebuilt computers, but normally it pertains to homebuilt aircraft, also known as amateur-built aircraft or kit planes. Homebuilt aircraft or kit cars are constructed by amateurs. Homebuilt computers have been built at home for a long time, starting with the Victorian era pioneer Charles Babbage in the 1820s. A century later, Konrad Zuse built his own machine when electromechanical relay technology was widely available. The hobby took off with the early development of microprocessors and, since then, many enthusiasts have constructed their own computers. A homebuilt vehicle is a wider concept than a kit car. A homebuilt vehicle is a motor vehicle (car, truck or motorcycle) built by an individual instead of a manufacturer. These machines may be constructed "from scratch", from plans, or from assembly kits. Outside of the United States (for example in Russia) people wishing to build such complex machinery often have no professional networks to rely on for spare parts, plans, or advice in the matter and therefore have to rely on their ingenuity and intuition in order to build a machine that works.

== Examples of home-built machinery ==
- Amateur radio homebrew – Homebrew is an amateur radio slang term for home-built, noncommercial radio equipment.
- Amateur telescope making – The field of amateur telescope making is considered an offshoot of the amateur astronomy community. Amateur telescope makers (sometimes called ATMs), as their name implies, are not paid professionals. They build their telescopes for the enjoyment of the hobby, or so they can make a personal contribution to the field of astronomy.
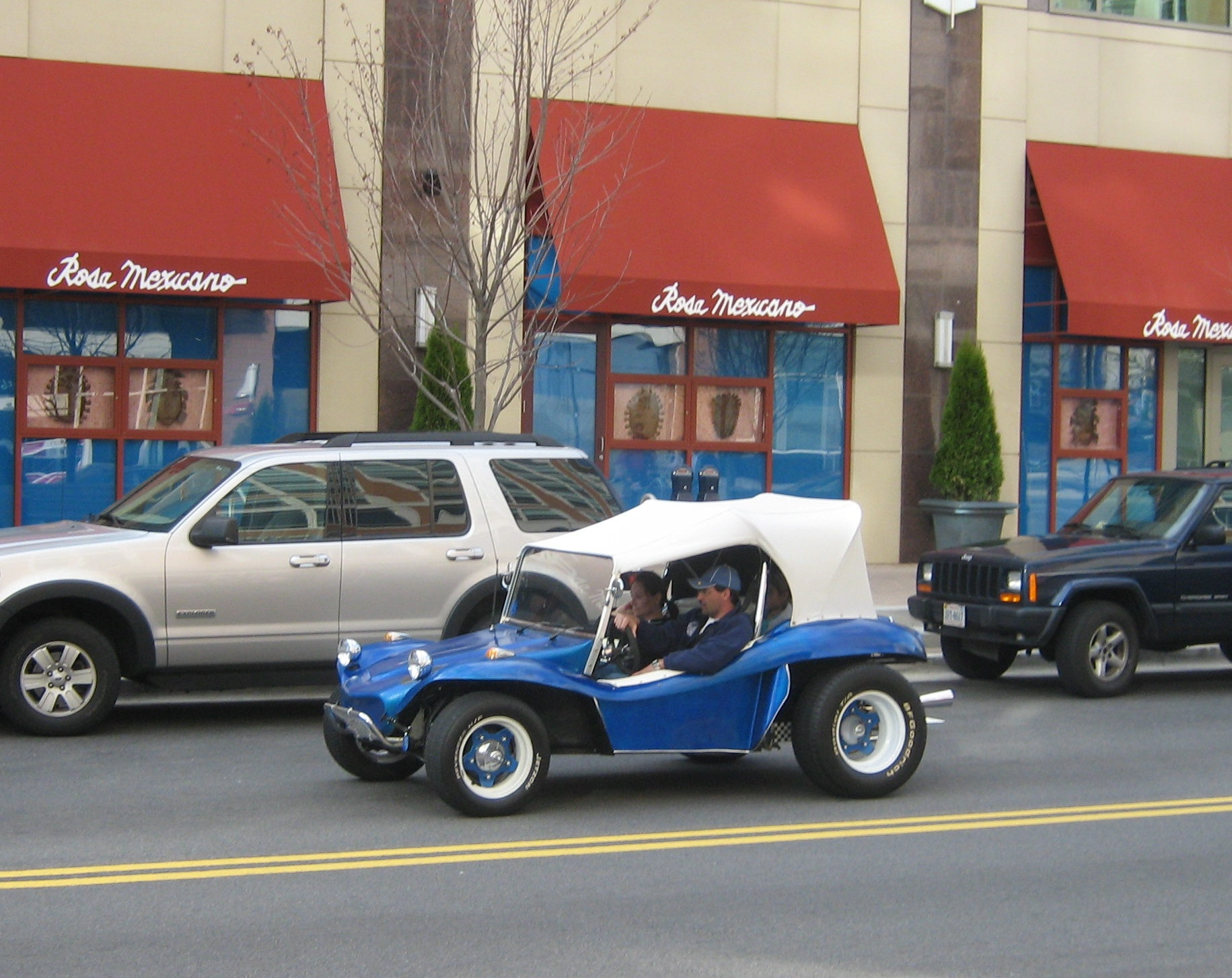
- Custom made dune buggy
  Dune buggy - popular method of building a dune buggy involves construction of a vehicle frame from steel tubing formed and welded together. The advantage of this method is that the fabricator can change fundamental parts of the vehicle (usually the suspension and addition of a built-in roll cage). Buggies of this type are called sandrails because of the rail frame. Sandrails, as with the VW Bug, often have the engine located behind the driver. Sizes can vary from a small engined one seat size to 4 seat, 8+ cylinder vehicles. Sandrails can have panels or custom shaped body coverings over the rails and tubing that comprise the vehicle, though many are left bare.
- Amateur rocketry sometimes known as amateur experimental rocketry or experimental rocketry is a hobby in which participants experiment with fuels and make their own rocket motors, launching a wide variety of types and sizes of rockets. Amateur rocketeers have been responsible for significant research into hybrid rocket motors, and have built and flown a variety of solid, liquid, and hybrid propellant motors. On May 17, 2004 Civilian Space eXploration Team (CSXT) successfully launched the first amateur high-power rocket into space, achieving an altitude of 72 miles (115 km). Prior to that the Reaction Research Society on November 23, 1996 launched a solid-fueled rocket, designed by longtime member George Garboden, to an altitude of 50 miles (80 km) from the Black Rock Desert in Nevada.
- Stitch and glue is a simple boat building method which uses plywood, epoxy glue, and "stitches" and eliminates the need for stems and chines. Plywood panels are cut to detailed profiles and stitched together to form an accurate hull shape, without the need for forms or special tools. This technique is also called "tack and tape", and "stitch and tape".

=== Gallery ===
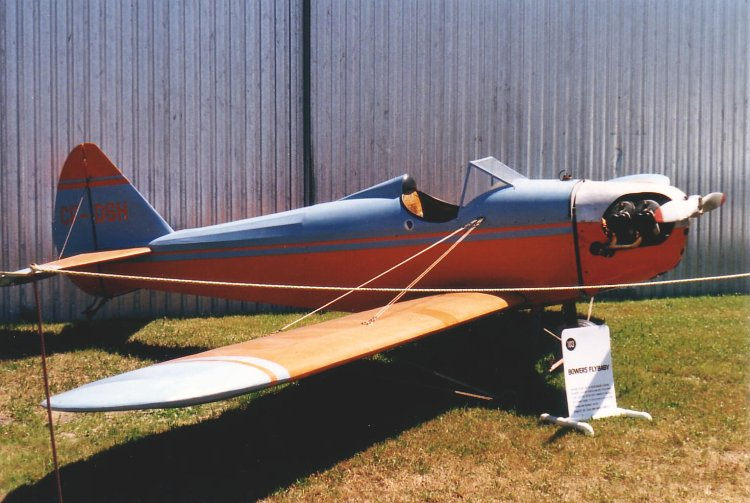
A typical wood and fabric construction amateur-built, the Bowers Fly Baby.

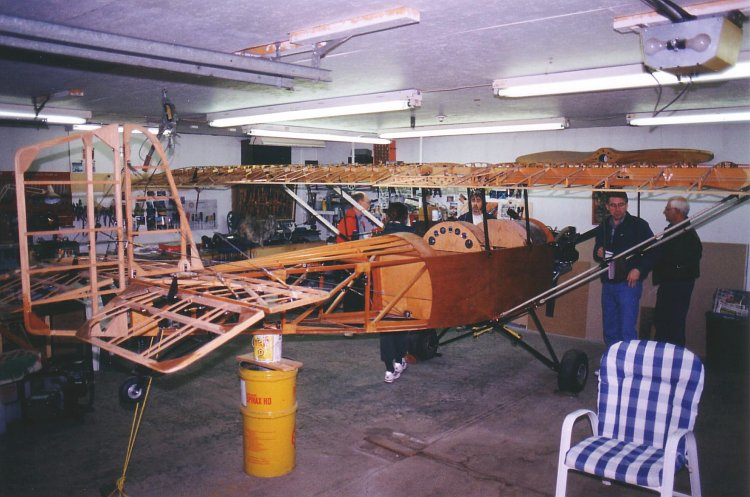
A Pietenpol Air Camper under construction, showing the wooden frame structure that will be covered with aircraft fabric.

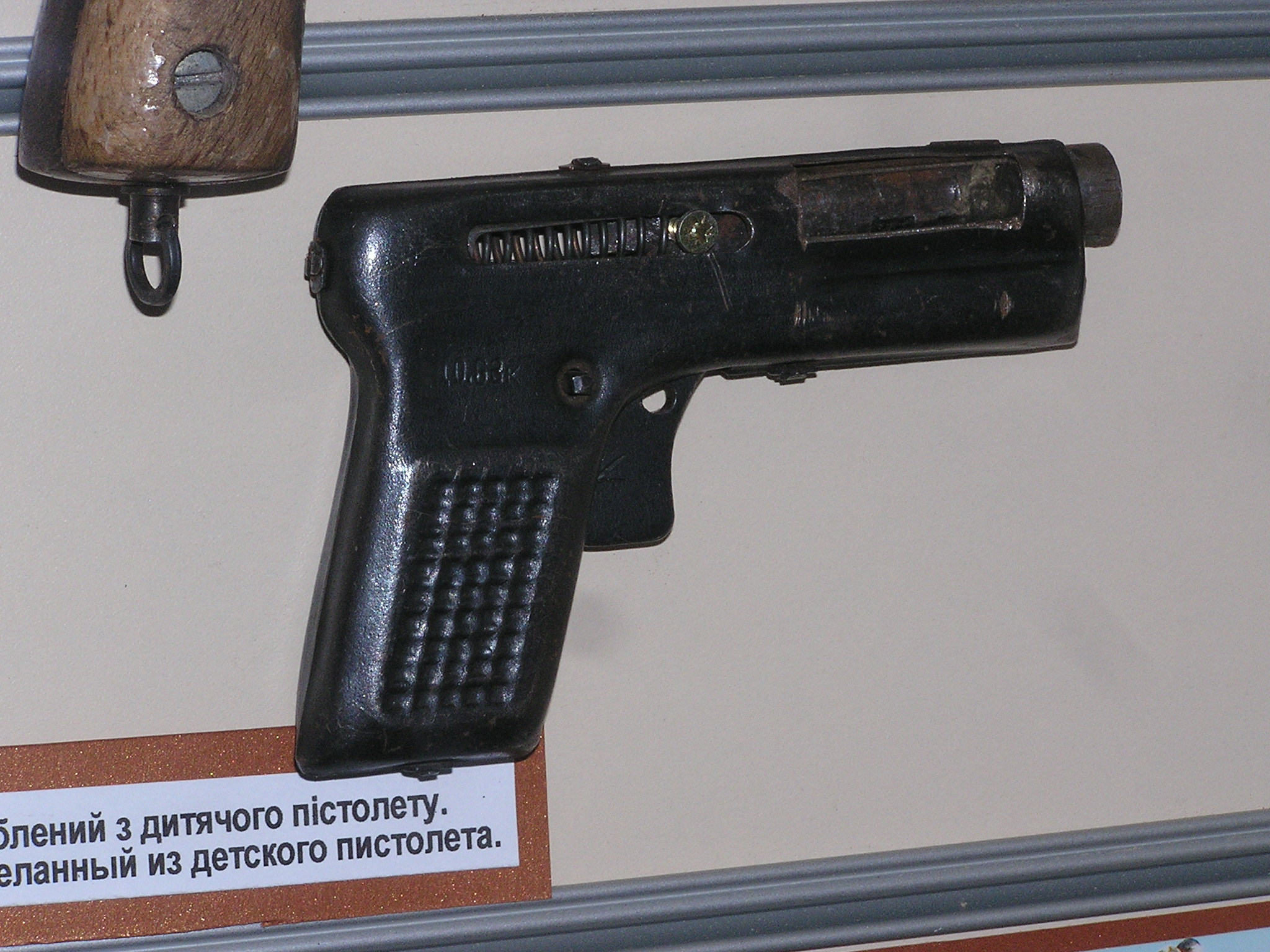

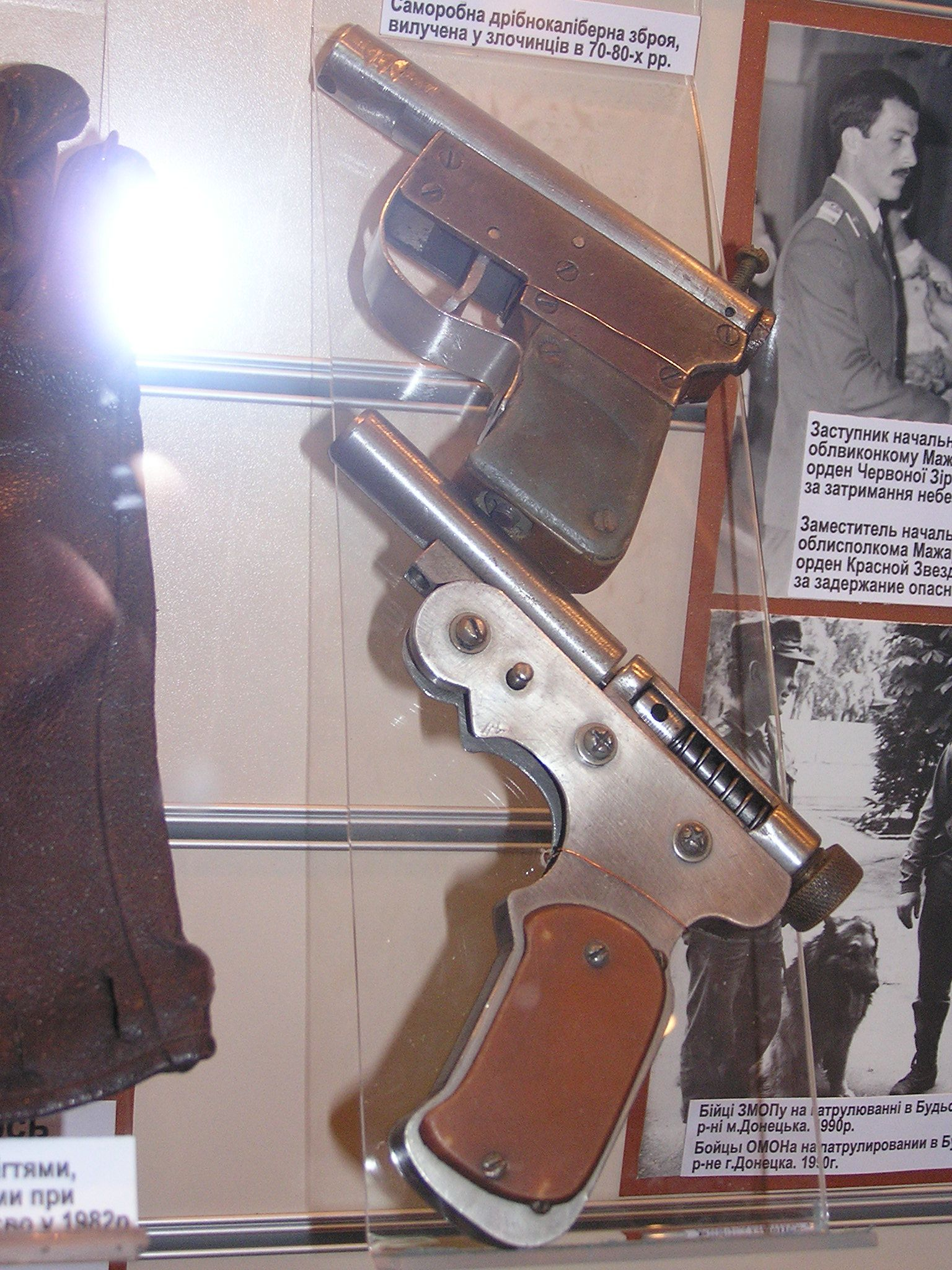
Homebuilt guns from the USSR

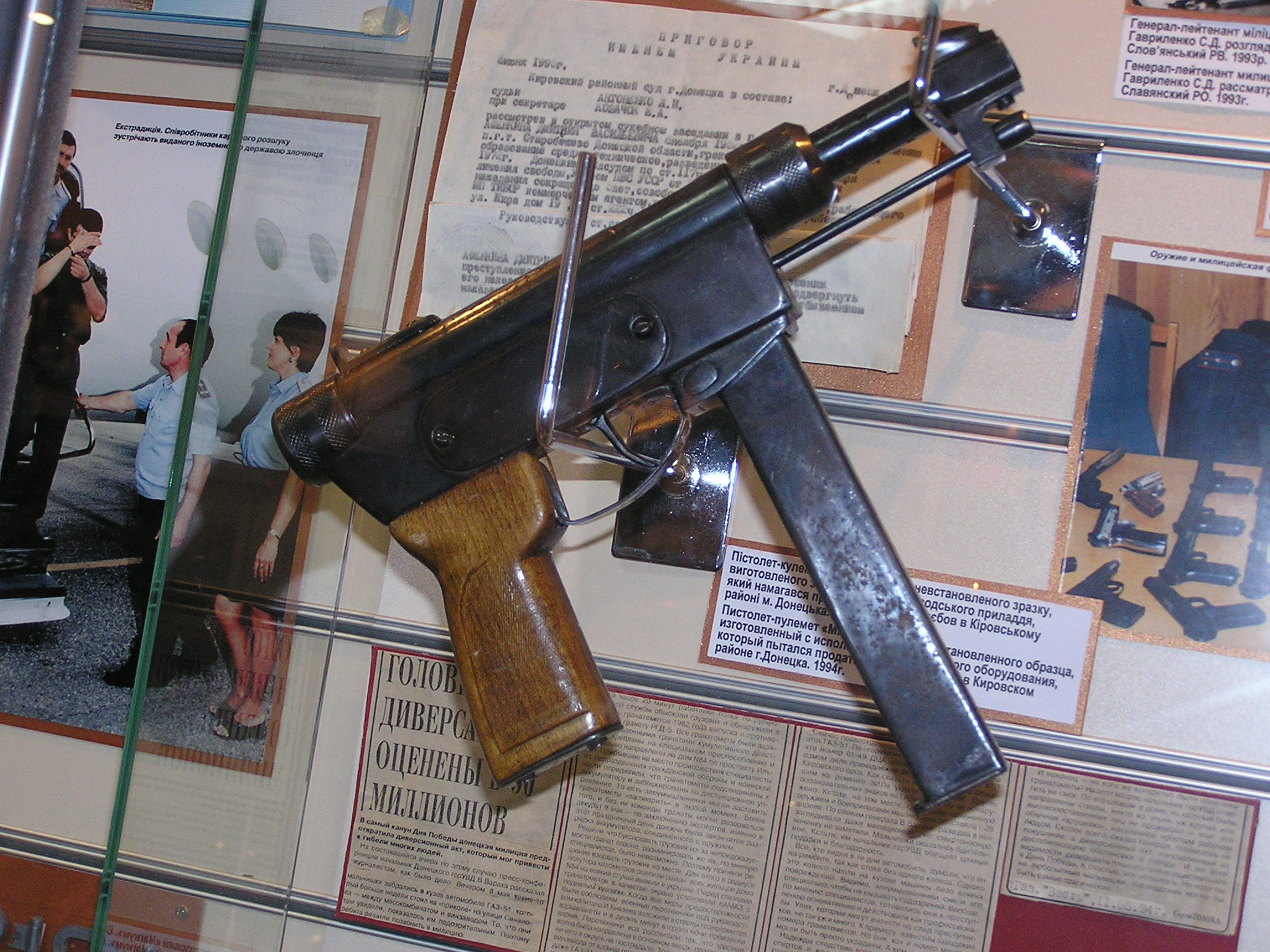
Borz, a weapon of insurgency that is built in tiny workshops which can qualify it as "homebuilt"

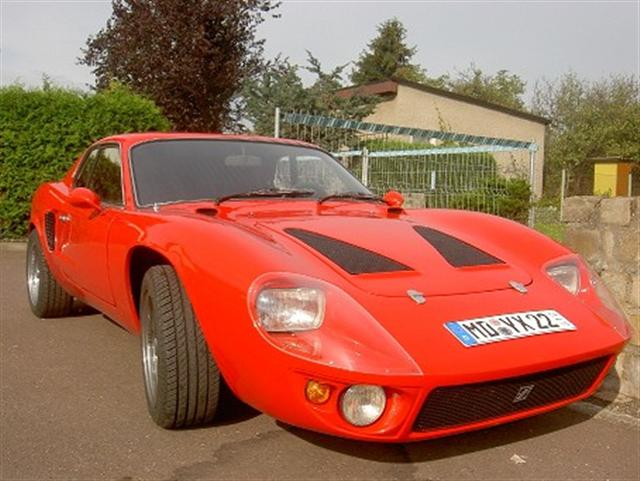
Fiberfab FT Bonito, a kit-car on a VW Beetle chassis.

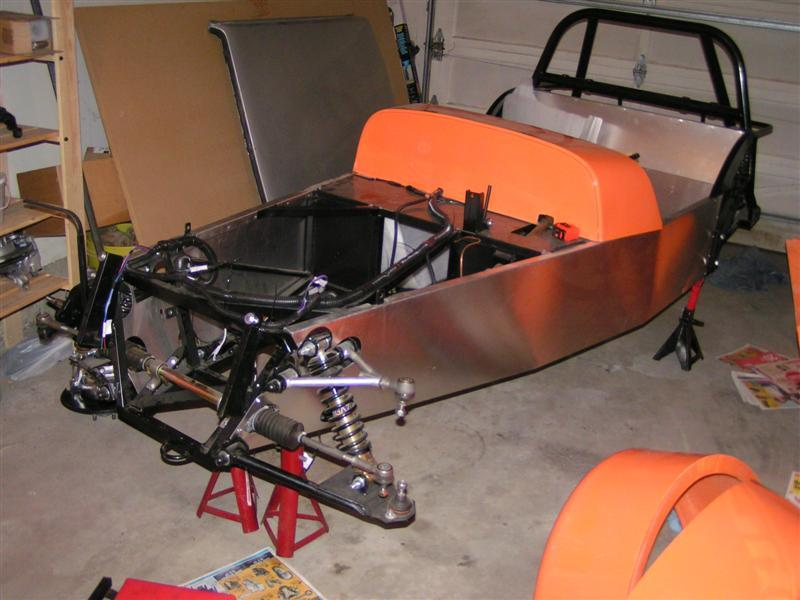
Locost frame and body panels.

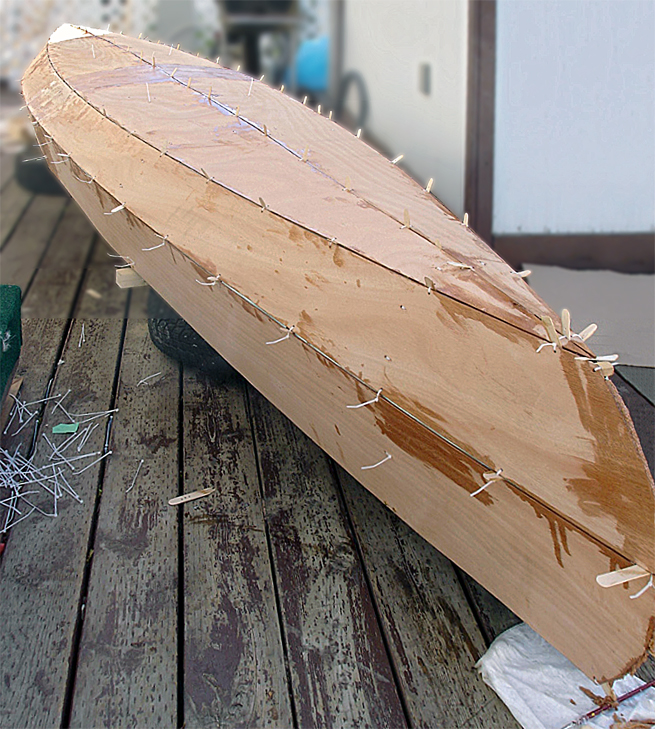
A stitched canoe hull under construction.
