= High-power rocketry =

Hobby

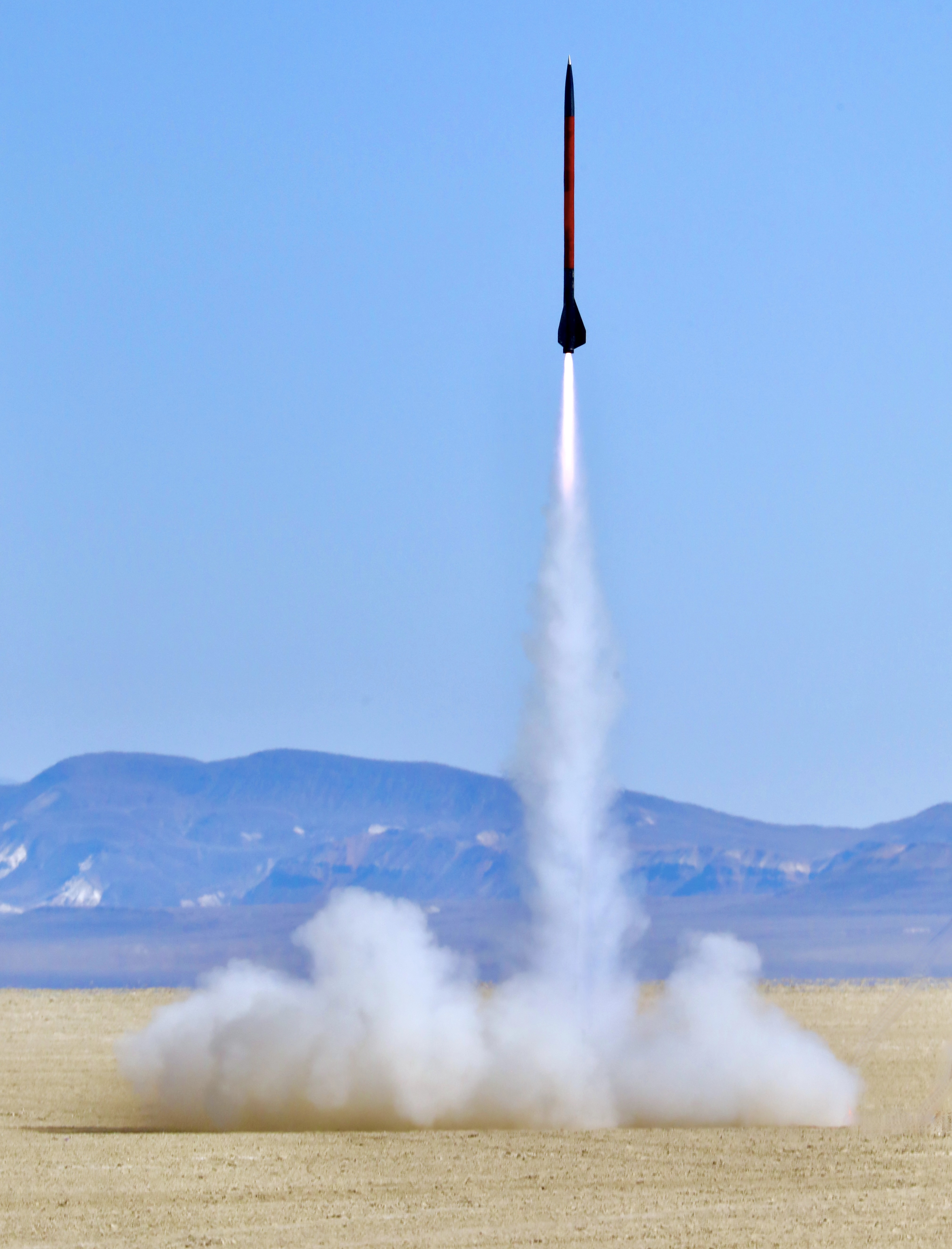
A high-powered rocket launch in the Black Rock Desert

High-power rocketry is a hobby similar to model rocketry. The major difference is that higher impulse range motors are used. The National Fire Protection Association (NFPA) definition of a high-power rocket is one that has a total weight of more than 1,500 grams (3.3 lb) and contains a motor or motors containing more than 125 grams (4.4 oz) of propellant and/or rated at 160.1 newton-seconds (40.47 lbf·s) or more of total impulse, or that uses a motor with an average thrust of 80 newtons (18 lbf) or more.

== Types ==
High-power rockets are defined as rockets flown using commercially available motors ranging from H to O model rocket motor classes. In the U.S., the NFPA1122 standard dictates guidelines for model rocketry, while NFPA1127 is specific to high-power rockets. In most U.S. states NFPA1122 has been adopted as part of the legal code. A smaller number of states use NFPA1127.

== Associations ==
The Tripoli Rocketry Association and the National Association of Rocketry are the major sanctioning bodies for the hobby in the US, providing member certifications, and criteria for general safety guidelines.

In most other countries where HPR is supported, the regulations are similar to or derived from the Tripoli Rocket Association Unified Safety Code and the NAR High-power Certification system.

In Australia, there are several prefectures of the Tripoli Rocketry Association.

In Canada, the Canadian Association of Rocketry - L'Association Canadienne De Fuséologie is appointed as regulator for the hobby.

In New Zealand, the controlling body for rocketry is the New Zealand Rocketry Association or NZRA

In South Africa, the controlling body for rocketry is the Rocketry Organization of South Africa or Rocketry SA.

In the UK the British Model Flying Association or BMFA is the governing body with United Kingdom Rocketry Association or UKRA acting as the High Power Association for Motor flights classed as H and above.

In Germany, Austria and Switzerland, the Interessengemeinschaft Modellraketen has an approved HPR certification program which is cross-recognized by NAR, CAR and UKRA.

== Certification ==
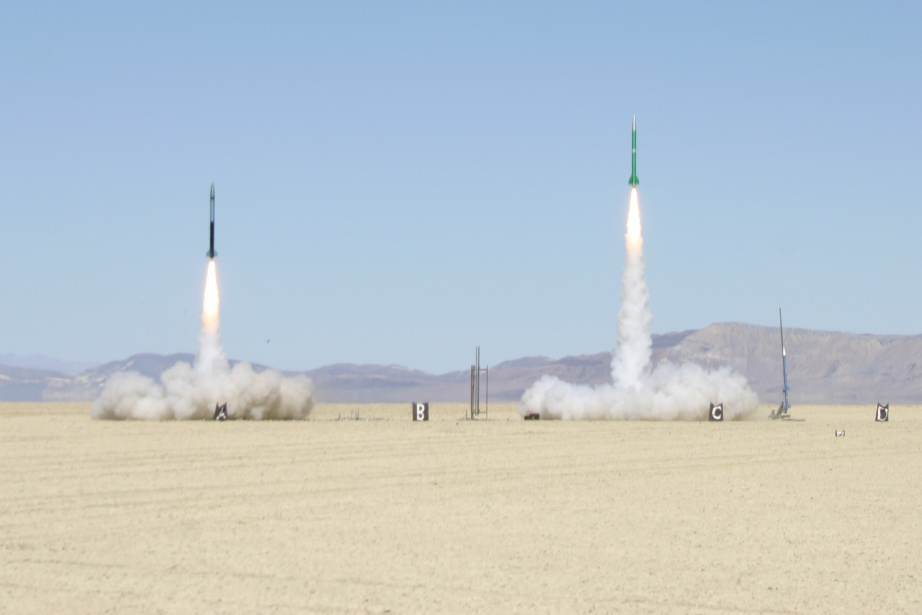
Two high-power rockets lift off at the Black Rock Desert in Nevada

=== Certification in the United States and Canada ===
Unlike model rocketry, certification is required by the governing organizations in order for individuals to fly high-powered rockets. The certification system is standardized across the hobby and governing organizations. There are three levels of certification, each allowing the user to fly successively larger motors. In the US (TRA and NAR):

High power motor level and classification:

Type	Total Impulse (Newton seconds)
H	160.1–320.0
I	320.1–640.0
J	640.1–1280.0
K	1280.1–2560.0
L	2560.1–5120.0
M	5120.1–10240.0
N	10240.1–20480.00
O	20480.1–40960.00

Level 1: H, I

Level 2: J, K, L

Level 3: M, N, O and beyond

Note: In Canada, the Canadian Association of Rocketry has an additional step to Level 4, which is equivalent to the US Level 3. Level 1 is H motor, Level 2 is I motor and CAR Level 3 and 4 is the same as U.S. Level 2 and 3, respectively. Due to a change by the Board of Directors upon recommendation from the RSO Committee, all hybrids are considered High Power.

In order to gain certification an individual needs to demonstrate their ability to fly a rocket within the given power range of the level they are seeking successfully. For example, if an individual desires to gain a Level 1 certification they must successfully fly an H-I motor in an appropriately sized rocket and retrieve it successfully in a condition suitable to launch it again safely. This is also true for Level 2 and 3 certification with the added requirements that, for Level 2 a written test be successfully passed and for Level 3 the build be documented and overseen by two designated technical authorities called TAPs (Technical Advisory Panel) who are themselves Level 3 certified and notably proficient at rocketry. The level 3 technical authorities are authorized by the respective Tripoli or NAR national organizations. These requirements vary slightly between NAR and Tripoli, but are very close in both organizations.

The above rocket motor impulse levels would all be classified as Class 2 rockets per the US Federal Code of Federal Regulations CFR Title 14 Aeronautics and Space, Part 101, Subpart C, 101.22 Definitions:

“(b) Class 2—High-Power Rocket means an amateur rocket other than a model rocket that is propelled by a motor or motors having a combined total impulse of 40,960 Newton-seconds (9,208 pound-seconds) or less.

(c) Class 3—Advanced High-Power Rocket means an amateur rocket other than a model rocket or high-power rocket".

Tripoli Rocketry Association maintains a Class 3 review committee who voluntarily (not required by the FAA) review rockets with altitudes expecting to reach or exceed 50,000 feet and as a pre-check for rocket projects that will be submitted to the FAA as a class 3 project. The Class 3 review committee performs the following functions:

- Performing a 3-sigma, 6-degree of freedom dispersion analysis on submitted projects.
- Providing guidance and a review of the Class 3 waiver application package prior to FAA submittal.
- Working with the FAA/AST to educate applicants and FAA personnel to the needs of Class 3 project teams in maintaining the viability and safety of the hobby now and in the future.
- To work toward achieving a more efficient and meaningful opportunity for members to pursue Class 3 and beyond flight attempts.

Under the US rules, rockets larger than 40,960 Newton-seconds (total impulse more than an O-class) can be launched, but are classified as Class 3 rockets and require individual approval from the Federal Aviation Administration. The class 3 approval is fairly involved necessitating 6-degree of freedom dispersion analysis for the returning rocket, a documentation of launch/ no-launch criteria among other things. Rockets with a total impulse of up to S (at least 327,680 Newton-seconds) have been launched by amateurs under the class-3 rules.

Between the two US certifying entities NAR and Tripoli, there is reciprocity of certification. For example, a Level 2 certified NAR member can be recognized by Tripoli as a Level 2 as both certifying entities are simply enforcing the same NFPA (National Fire Protection Act) and FAA/CFR regulations. Achieving dual certification would require paying dues to both entities. Between NAR and Tripoli the primary differences are: NAR tends to focus more on model rockery and contests. It appeals to children, scouting groups and novelty launches like hang-time and egg tosses. Tripoli's focus is geared more toward higher power, experimental and advanced rocketry. Tripoli for example encourages experimental (EX) or ammonium-perchlorate based non-commercial individually manufactured rocket motors for Level 2 and above certified fliers as well as hybrid motors (for example nitrous oxide gaseous oxidizer and solid rubber fuel). Tripoli also has active mentoring programs with many engineering programs of US universities and as above supports the exploration of the hard science of and limitations of rocketry by educated private citizens including class-3 rocketry. The non-NASA private spaceflight companies are launching what are classified as Class 3 rockets and above. At least one current employee of Space-X obtained his experience flying high powered rockets with the Tripoli Houston prefecture of the national organization as a university student enrolled in the engineering program of a local university.

=== Certification in the United Kingdom ===
The UKRA offer a certification program in the UK similar to the US, but limited to O. The process is very similar to that of the US.

Level 1 : H, I

Level 2 : J, K, L

Level 3 : M, N, O

Range Safety Officer (RSO)

The requirements for level 1 certification are a successful test flight with a level 1 size motor in front of a UKRA certified RSO.

A level 2 certificate requires a successful test flight with a level 2 sized motor witnessed by an RSO. The candidate also has to pass a multiple choice written exam set by the UKRA.

A level 3 candidate has to submit a detailed written report on their rocket to the UKRA Safety and Technical Committee, who will also examine the rocket prior to launch. After the written report has been approved and the rocket inspected, the candidate must then complete a successful test flight to obtain his level 3 certification.

Any UKRA member can apply to be a Range Safety Officer. The candidate must pass the level 2 written exam and pass an interview. An RSO can be either a Model Rocket RSO, Level 1 RSO, Level 2 RSO or Level 3 RSO, depending on the certification level they hold. The RSO can only act at launches involving rockets of his level of certification or lower.

Third party indemnity insurance is only provided by the British Model Flying Association (BMFA) and is included as part of the membership package. High Power Rocket fliers must hold the appropriate certificate for the size of motor that they are flying, and abide by the UKRA safety rules, for insurance to be valid.

The UKRA recognize the certification from the following National Organisations, who also recognize the UKRA certifications.

- Interessengemeinschaft Modellraketen e.V. (IMR)
- National Association of Rocketry (NAR)
- Tripoli Rocketry Association (TRA)
- Canadian Association of Rocketry (CAR)

=== Certification in Australia ===
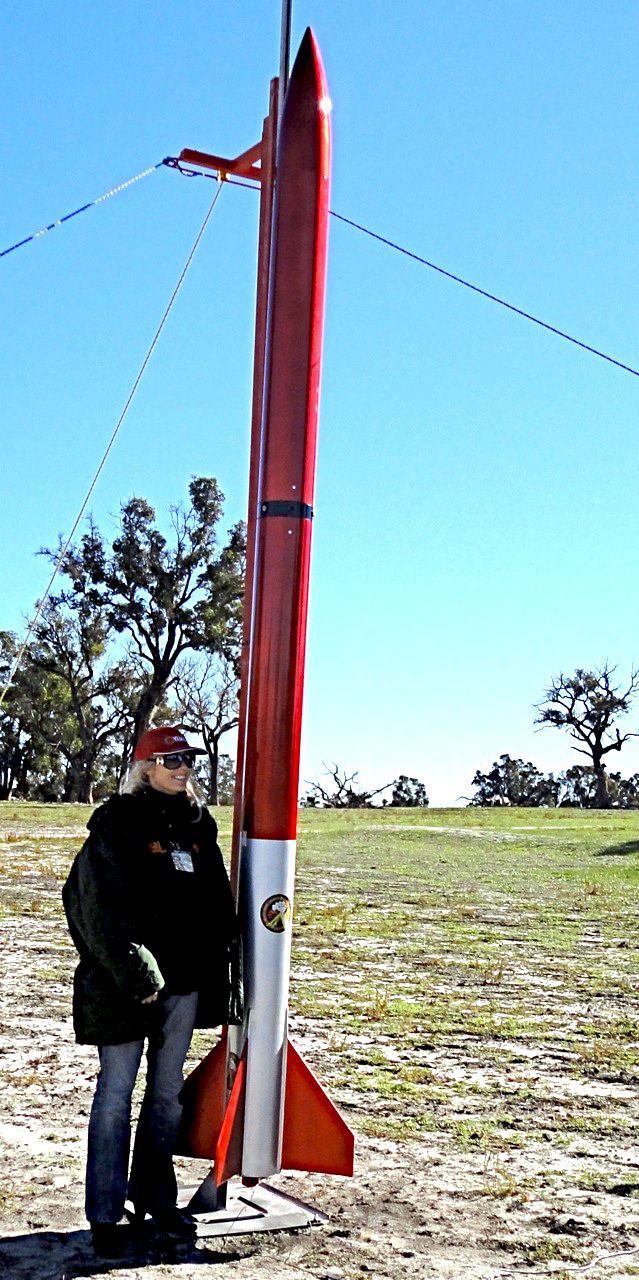
Samantha Ridgway, who designed, built, and flew the first TRA L3 in Australia

Certification may be achieved through:

- Australian Rocketry Association INC and its member clubs.
- The Tripoli Rocketry Association, which offers High Power Rocketry (HPR) certification to all Australians and is recognised internationally. It is the only truly international rocketry association in Australia and is the only rocketry association fully insured internationally.

=== Certification in South Africa ===
Rocketry SA offer a certification program in South Africa with similar processes and procedures to those of the US and UK.

Level 1 : H, I

Level 2 : J, K, L

Level 3 : M, N, O

To gain certification, an individual must demonstrate the ability to successfully build, launch, and recover a rocket within the power range of the level being sought.

== Construction ==
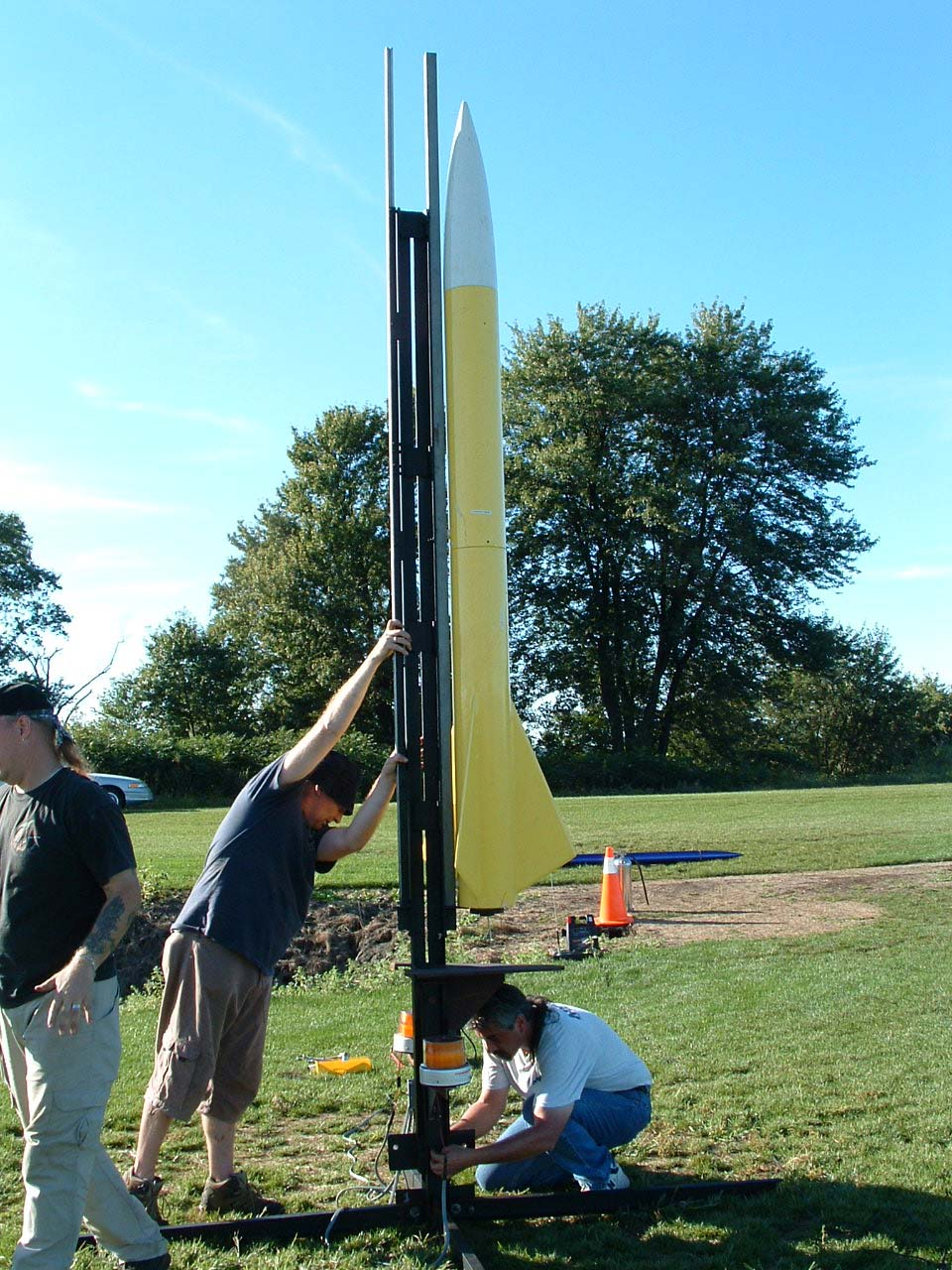
A high-power rocket being set up before flight

High-power rocket designs can vary widely as do anticipated altitudes and performance, but altitudes of 10,000 feet (3,048 m) and velocities in the supersonic ranges are not uncommon. A combination of (often) larger mass and higher apogees may require sophisticated recovery systems. High-power rockets are frequently flown with sophisticated electronic devices used for recording flight data (altitude, velocity, acceleration/deceleration, G-forces) and for deploying recovery methods or devices.

High-power rockets are constructed from materials such as phenolic resin, fiberglass, carbon fiber, and other composite materials and plastics. Motor casings are normally machined aluminium with ablative phenolic or paper liners and are reloadable, i.e. can be used multiple times.

== Propulsion ==
High-power rockets are predominantly powered by commercially available APCP-based motors or nitrous oxide-based hybrid motors.

Motors for High-Power Rocketry are typically "H" and above (with a few notable exceptions in the "G" range). The lettered naming system is a standard in the hobby in which successive letters double the delivered impulse of the previous letter. Each letter also has a range of impulses under which a given motor can be classified.

== Obtaining rocket motors in the United Kingdom ==
Black powder motors, typically manufactured by companies such as Estes and Quest are classed as fireworks, and subject to few purchase restrictions in the UK, the main restriction being the purchaser must be over 18 years old. The motors are available up to class D in the UK and only suitable for low power model rockets.

Ammonium Perchlorate is classed as an explosive by the UK Health and Safety Executive, so Ammonium Perchlorate Composite Propellant (AP) motors formerly required the purchaser to have an Explosives Licence and Recipient Competent Authority Transfer Document (RCA). A Registered Store Certificate was also required if the purchaser wanted to store the motors rather than purchase them at the flying event and use them immediately.

The UKRA has negotiated an exemption so that model rocket fliers can obtain some AP motors in limited quantities without the need for an explosives licence. Since 4 December 2007, model rocketeers have been able to purchase AP motors with a net weight less than 1 kg of propellant without an Explosives Licence. They can also store motors up to a total net weight of 5 kg without needing an Explosives Licence or Registered Store Certificate. They will still require an RCA document. This can be obtained from the UK HSE by writing an appropriate letter to them requesting an exemption for model rocket motors. This document is currently issued free of charge, although this may change.

A motor with 1 kilogram (2.2 lb) of propellant is a K impulse motor, so model rocketeers can now fly level 2 models without the need for an explosives license, however an RCA is still required. This relaxation in the regulations has made mid and high power rocketry much more accessible in the UK.

== Recovery ==
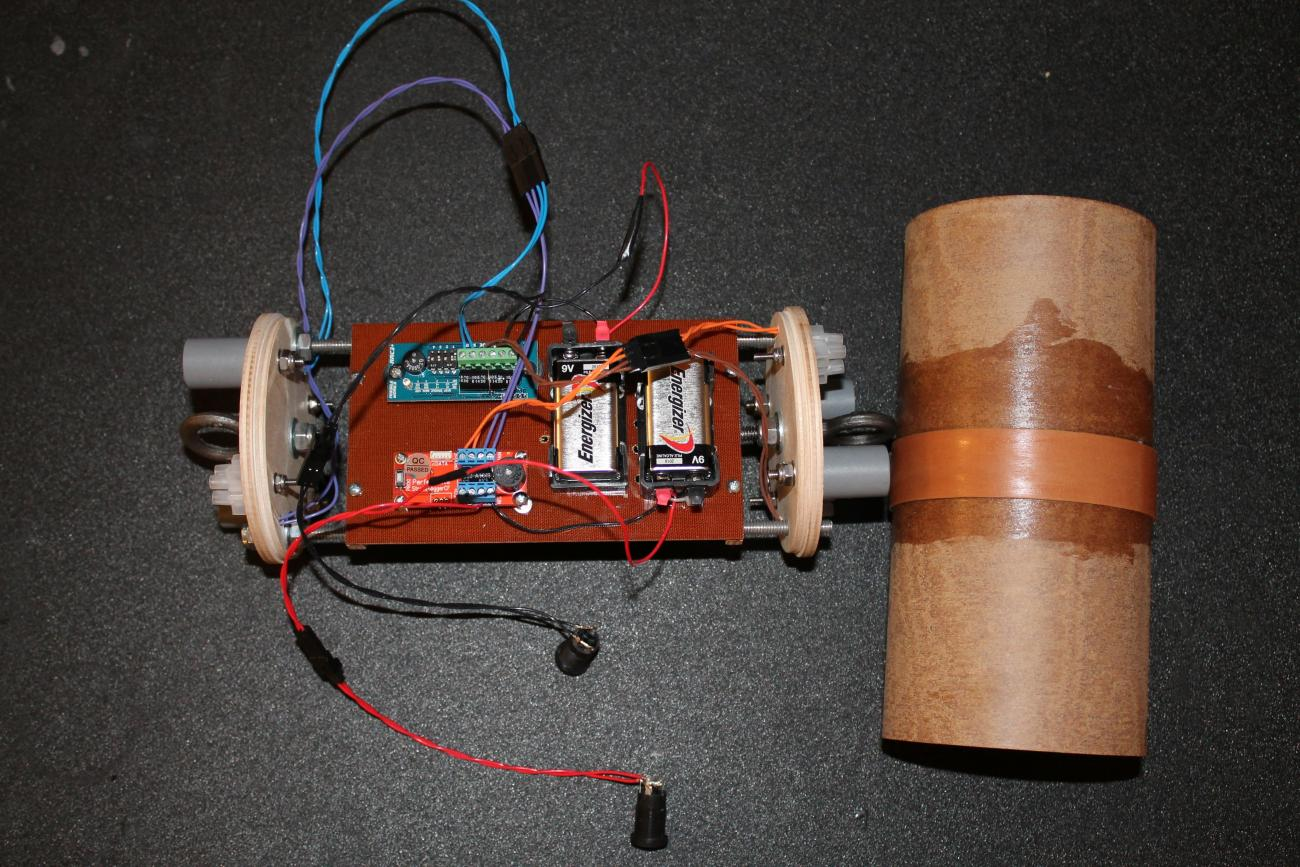
A typical altimeter-based deployment bay.

In model rocketry, a parachute, streamer or other recovery device or method deploys at apogee, but high-power rockets may employ more complex recovery systems since altitudes can be much higher than their counterparts. In a high-power rocket, an altimeter or electronic timer may deploy a drogue parachute (which stabilizes the rocket in descent) or a controlled freefall (where the fore and aft sections are merely separated by a tether or umbilical cord, often made of tubular nylon). These recovery events can be brought about by small explosive charges (black powder or Pyrodex) or pressurized gasses (e.g., CO_{2}). At an altitude predetermined by the hobbyist, an altimeter deploys a main parachute that slows the rocket to a safe recovery speed. The most common varieties of altimeter use accelerometers, barometric sensors or a combination of both.

== See also ==
- Model rocket
- Amateur rocketry
- Sounding rocket
- Friends of Amateur Rocketry
- Delft Aerospace Rocket Engineering
- Civilian Space eXploration Team
