= Joe Barnard =

American entrepreneur, amateur rocketry developer, YouTuber

- Born: Joe Barnard
- Education: Berklee College of Music (B.A.)
- Years active: 2015–present

YouTube information
- Channels: BPS.space; BPS.shorts; Joe Barnard
- Genre: Engineering
- Subscribers: 839 thousand (BPS.space); 423 thousand (BPS.shorts); 52.9 thousand (Joe Barnard)
- Views: 60 million (BPS.space); 167 million (BPS.shorts); 4.3 million (Joe Barnard)
- Last updated: January 9, 2026
- Website: bps.space

Joe Barnard is an American entrepreneur, amateur rocketry developer, and founder of Barnard Propulsion Systems (or BPS), best known for his YouTube channels BPS.space, BPS.shorts, and Joe Barnard.

== BPS.space ==
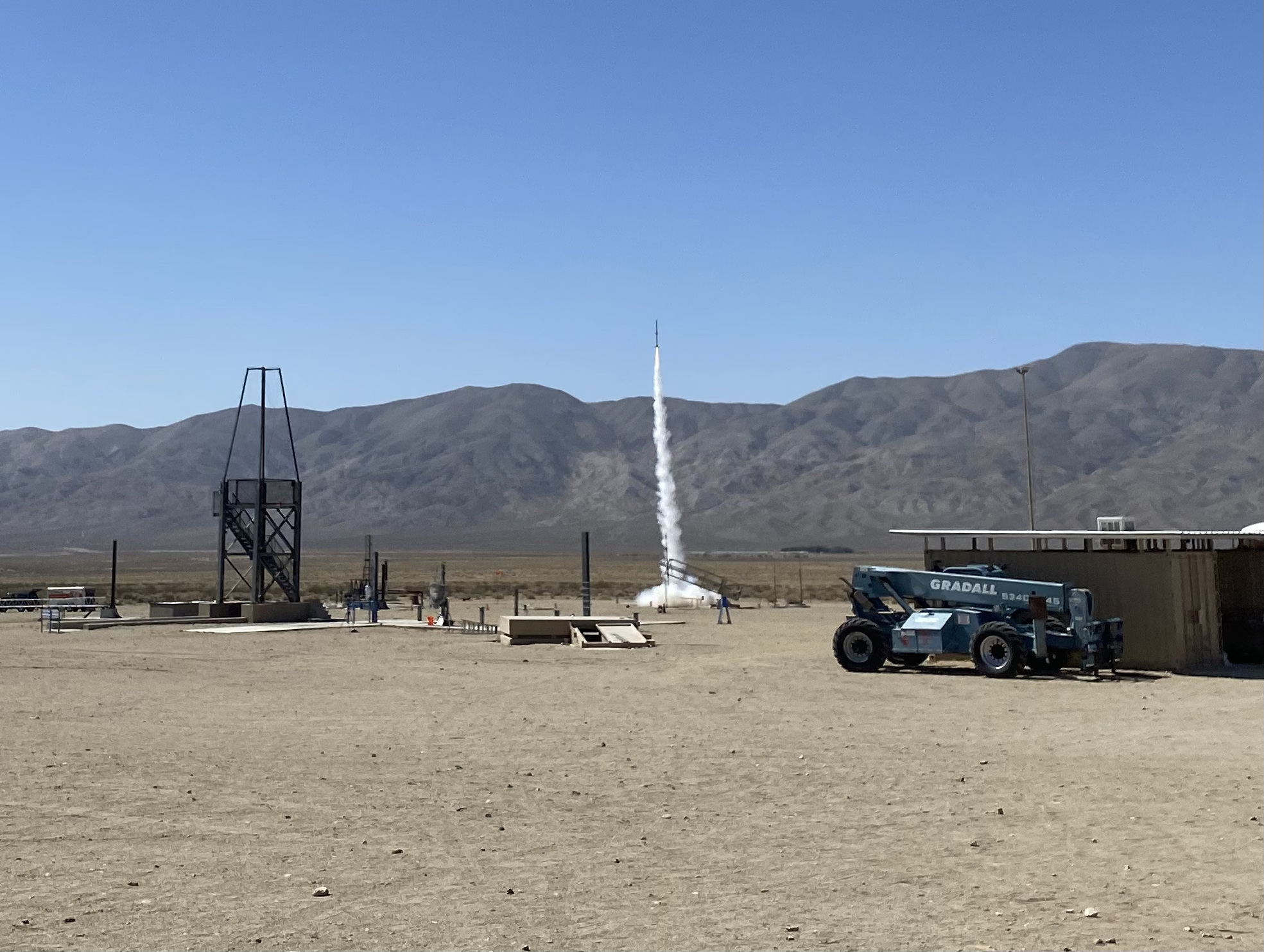
Friends of Amateur Rocketry facility in the Mojave Desert, the launch site of many BPS.space projects

Barnard created the BPS.space project in 2015 to build model rockets after viewing a SpaceX online broadcast.

=== Vertical takeoff and landing ===
Over seven years, he iteratively developed his Scout rocket design and ultimately built a model rocket capable of vertical takeoff and landing. This required developing thrust vector control, throttle control of the solid rocket motor, and a flight control computer and software.

=== Other rocketry projects ===
Barnard has pursued several other rocketry-related projects, including building multistage rockets, flight control computers, rocket motors, and image stabilization hardware.

BPS.space has also served as a business venture for Barnard, where he sells Arduino-based flight control computers for model rockets.

== Personal life ==
Barnard completed his undergraduate degree in Audio Engineering from Berklee College of Music in 2014, and worked as a wedding photographer before working full time at BPS.space. BPS.space became Barnard's full-time job, funded through a combination of merchandise and control board sales, Patreon sponsorship, and YouTube advertising and ad revenue.

He previously lived in Nashville, Tennessee before moving to the Los Angeles area of California in 2021.

Barnard had no background in rocketry before starting, and is entirely self-taught; though his father worked on missile guidance, navigation, and control systems.

In 2021 and 2022, Barnard, Xyla Foxlin, and others launched a rocket-powered Christmas tree at Friends of Amateur Rocketry.
