= NZRA =

NZRA can refer to:

- New Zealand Rocketry Association
- Raglan Aerodrome, Raglan, New Zealand
- Republican Association of New Zealand
