= Friends of Amateur Rocketry =

Organization testing and launching rockets

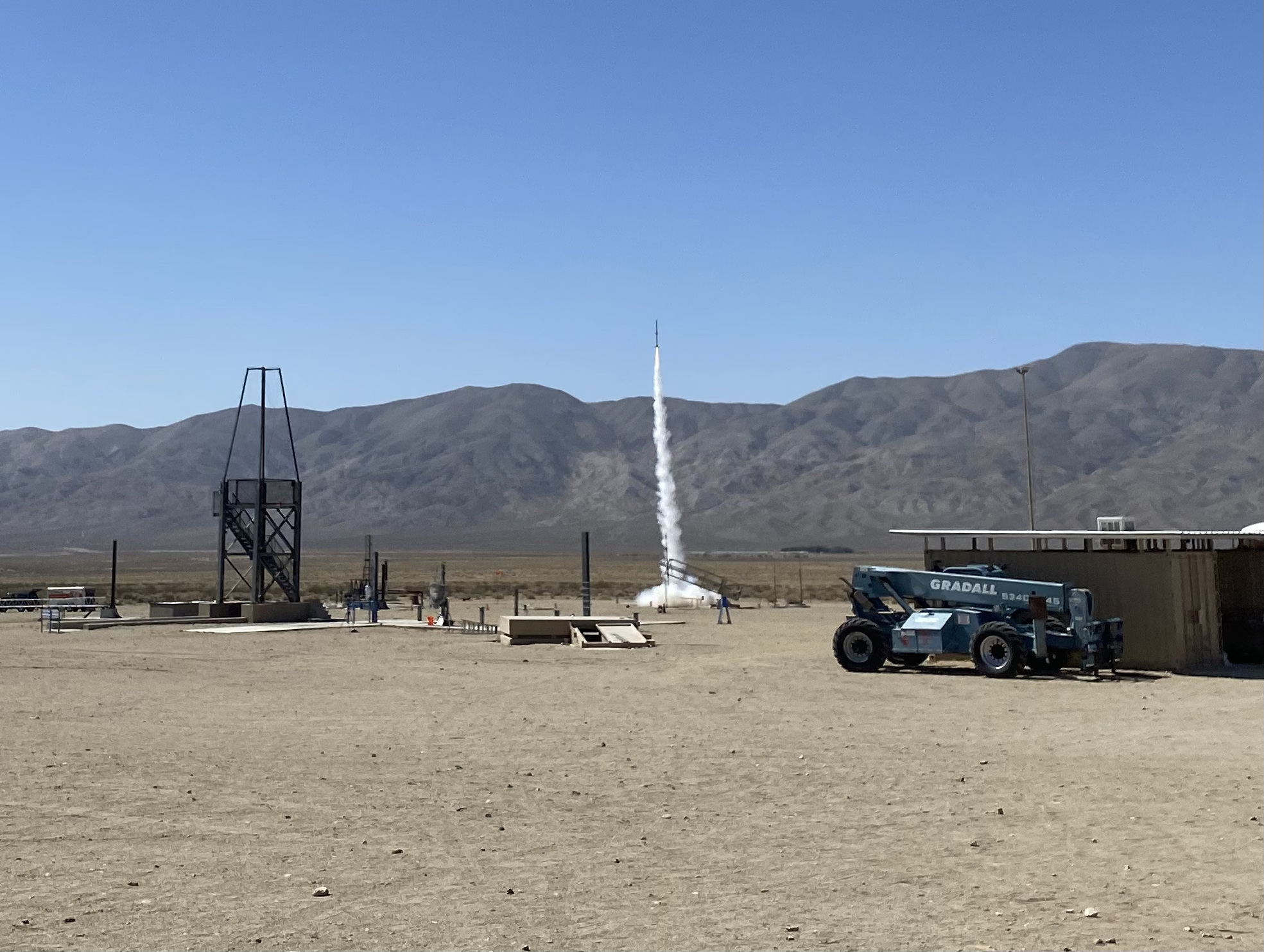
Amateur rocket launch at FAR

Friends of Amateur Rocketry, better known simply as FAR, is an educational 501(c)3 nonprofit corporation providing infrastructure for static test firing and launching; small, medium, and large; solid, hybrid, and liquid; commercial and experimental rockets. Their static test firing and launch facility known as FAR Site is located North of Edwards Air Force Base in the Mojave Desert. FAR was begun in 2003 by several friends and rocketry buffs as a spin-off from RRS. The FAR Site has been used by multiple groups, including Unreasonable Rocket, CSULB, Garvey Spacecraft Corporation, UCSD, MythBusters and an episode of How Hard Can It Be? on the National Geographic Channel. FAR utilizes California State Fire Marshal licensed Pyrotechnic Operators-Class 1, 2, and 3 Rockets. FAR does not require an individual to have a National Association of Rocketry (NAR) or Tripoli Rocketry Association (TRA) certification to launch their rockets.

FAR is often featured as the launch site for the rockets of YouTuber Joe Barnard.

FAR is also organizing the FAR-OUT (Friends of Amateur Rocketry – Oxidizers Uninhibited Tournament) international rocketry competition.

== See also ==
- High-power rocketry
- Amateur & Experimental rocketry
- Reaction Research Society (RRS)
- National Association of Rocketry (NAR)
- Tripoli Rocketry Association (TRA)
