= Rocketry SA =

South African rocketry controlling body

Rocketry SA is the official voice and controlling body for all aspects of non-commercial and non-governmental rocketry in South Africa. The organization is registered as a non profit organization in South Africa. Rocketry SA promotes model rocketry, high-power rocketry, amateur rocketry, and aerospace modelling.

== History ==
The organization was established in 2003, under the name South African Amateur Space Association (SAASA).

During the 2013 Annual General Meeting of the Association, members voted in favour of a name change. Due to practical reasons, however, and in line with the legal requirements of registering a non-profit organization in South Africa, the name was only officially changed in 2017 to "Rocketry SA".

== Organizational structure ==
Rocketry SA functions as a member-based, non-profit organization. In line with South African law, the Organization appoints a CEO (chief executive office), supported by an EXCO (Executive committee).

Rocketry SA co-exists under the government-mandated South African National Space Agency (SANSA), which resides under the Department of Science and Technology (DSC), which in turn reports to the Minister of Science and Technology.

== Membership ==
Rocketry SA membership is open to any with a keen interest in promoting rocketry. Rocketry SA maintains a database of all registered rocketeers. This database includes information like certification level, which is used to determine which motors may be purchased by the member.
