= CSXT =

CSXT may refer to:

- CSX Transportation, a freight railroad company
- Civilian Space eXploration Team, an amateur rocketry group
