= NIAA =

NIAA may refer to:

- National Indigenous Australians Agency, an Australian government agency formed 2019
- National Indigenous Arts Awards, Australia
- Nebraska Intercollegiate Athletic Association, American intercollegiate athletic conference, 1928–1942
- Nevada Interscholastic Activities Association, an association in Nevada, United States
- Northern Ireland Association of Aeromodellers, an organization in Northern Ireland, United Kingdom
- Northwest Intercollegiate Athletic Association, an amateur athletics federation in the United States, 1902–1925
