= USC Rocket Propulsion Laboratory =

University Rocketry Organization

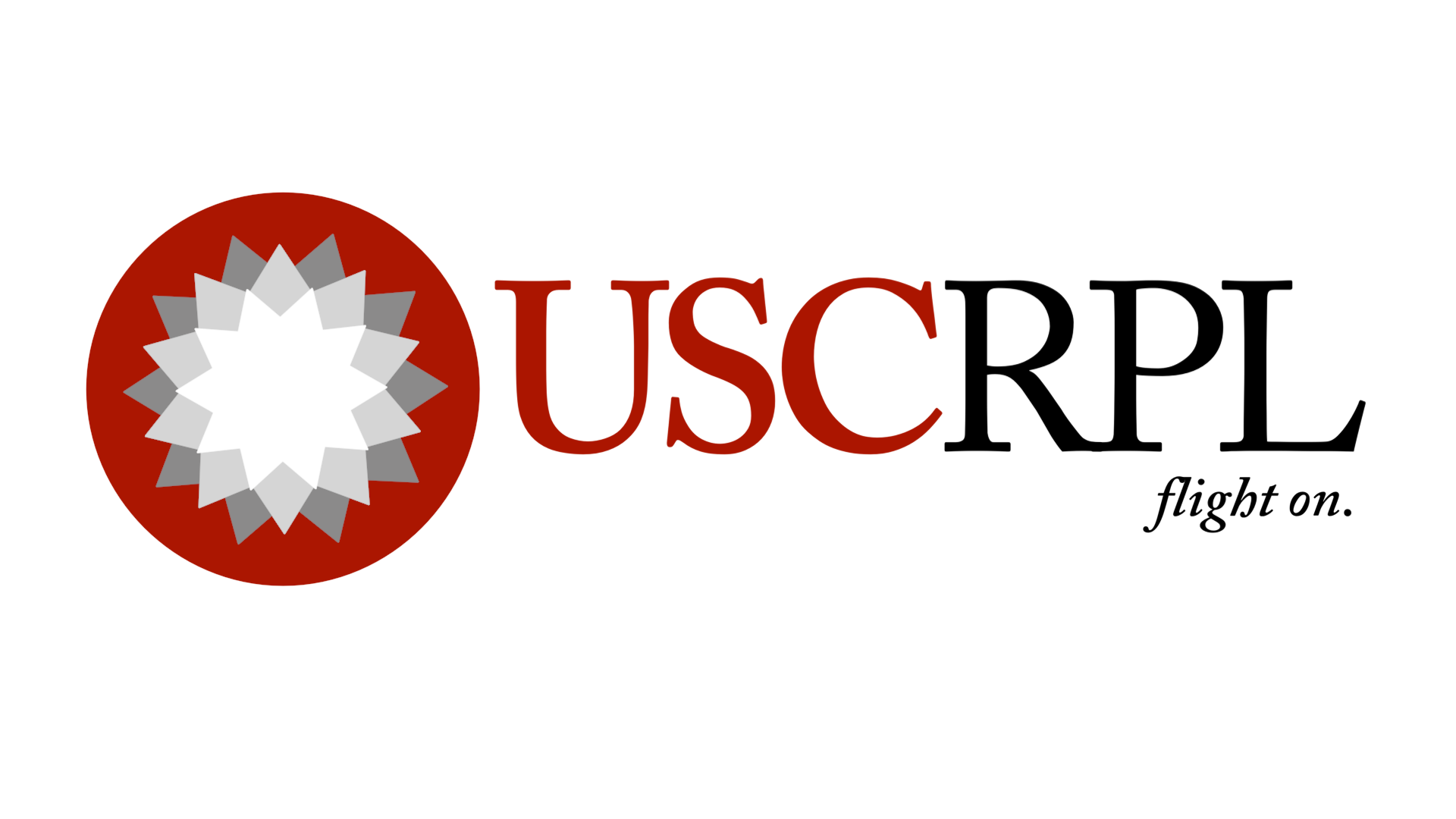

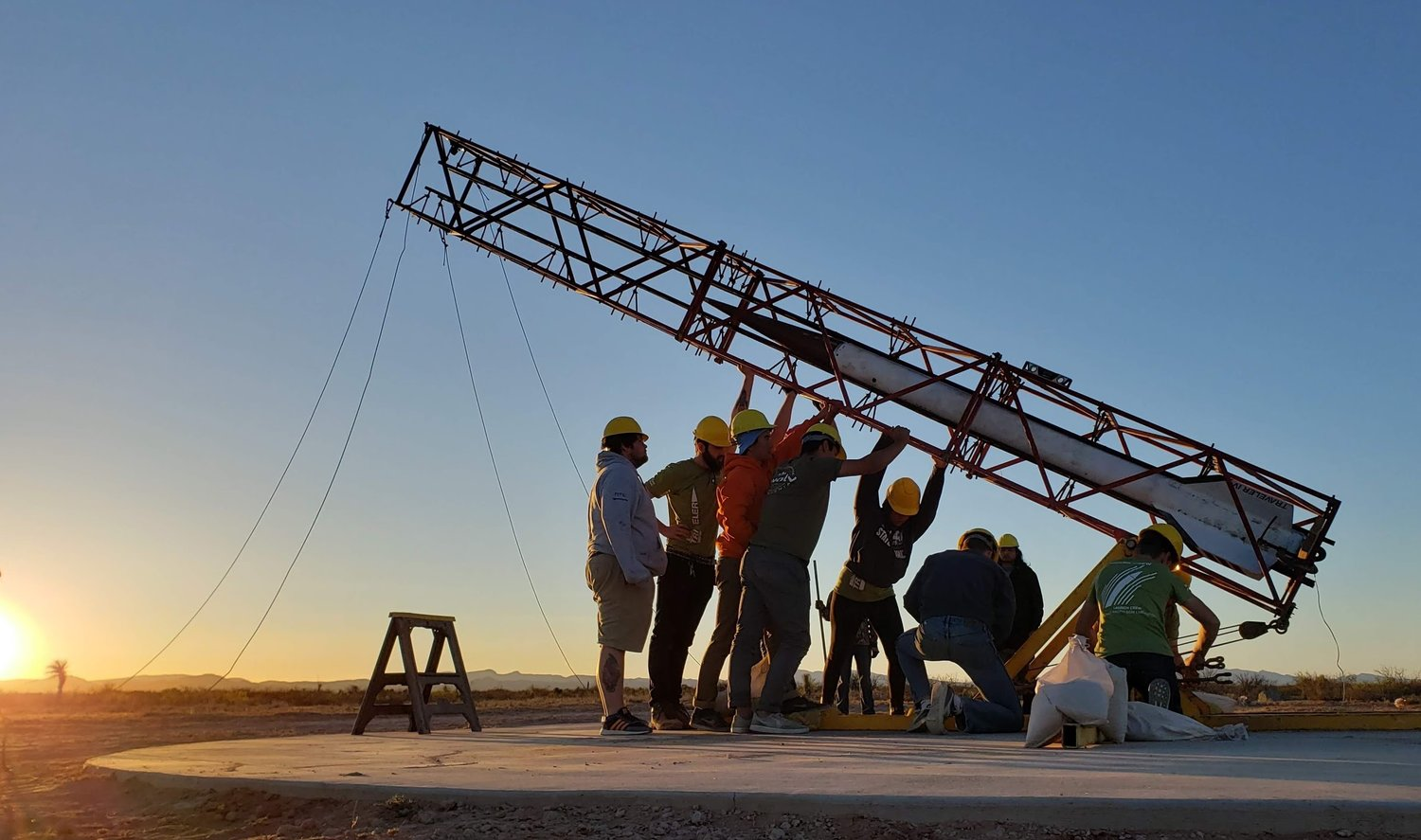
- Founded: 2005
- Headquarters: Los Angeles, California
- Members: Est. 150+
- Parent: USC Viterbi School of Engineering
- Website: www.uscrpl.com

The USC Rocket Propulsion Laboratory (USCRPL) is a student-run experimental rocketry organization at the University of Southern California (USC), founded with the goal of placing a student-designed and student-built rocket into space. Operating within the USC Viterbi School of Engineering's Department of Astronautical Engineering, the laboratory focuses on the development of high-performance solid-propellant rocket launch vehicles intended to reach or exceed the Kármán line.

USCRPL achieved the first student-designed and student-built rocket flight reported to have exceeded the Kármán line, accomplished by the Traveler IV vehicle in 2019. Subsequent vehicles, including Aftershock II in 2024 and Daybreak in 2026, were also reported by the organization to have surpassed the Kármán line, making USCRPL the only student rocketry group reported to have achieved spaceflight on multiple occasions. Following Aftershock II, the laboratory reported holding the amateur altitude and speed records.

== History ==
USCRPL was established in 2005 by then-undergraduate Ian Whittinghill, with support from the USC Department of Astronautical Engineering. The lab's initial mission was to design, build, and launch the first entirely student-developed rocket capable of reaching space. Early work focused on incremental testing of motors, structures, and systems through static fires, subscale vehicles, and development flights.

The lab operates primarily with undergraduate students and deliberately keeps almost all design, manufacturing, and testing in-house - from propellant chemistry and motor casings to printed circuit boards and flight software - in order to maximize hands-on experience across disciplines in furtherance of the lab's informal moto of "Raw materials in, rockets out". The organization is structured around project teams covering propulsion, structures, avionics, recovery, and operations, with members taking on increasing responsibility over their undergraduate years.

Following the disruptions of the COVID-19 pandemic, which cut off lab access and broke continuity between graduating classes, USCRPL rebuilt its internal knowledge base and returned to flight with a series of development vehicles before its 2024 spaceshot attempt.

In October 2023, USCRPL's Shockwave static-fire test set the world record for the most powerful solid-rocket motor fired by students, and the most powerful composite-case solid-rocket motor fired by amateurs.

== Organization and structure ==
USCRPL is housed within the USC Department of Astronautical Engineering and receives funding from the USC Viterbi School of Engineering alongside corporate sponsorships. Membership is open to undergraduates across engineering disciplines; members typically begin with hands-on fabrication tasks and progress to subsystem ownership and leadership roles. The lab has approximately 100–150 active members at any given time.

The organization maintains its own fabrication facilities, propellant mixing and casting capabilities, and avionics development infrastructure at USC. All major subsystems - including propellant formulation, motor casings, airframe structures, flight computers, and recovery systems - are designed and built internally. Professor Dan Erwin, chair of the USC Department of Astronautical Engineering, has served as a faculty advisor to the group.

== Propulsion ==
USCRPL develops high-performance composite propellant solid rocket motors entirely in-house. This distinguishes the lab from many university rocketry programs that use commercially sourced motors. The motors use a composite propellant formulation based on ammonium perchlorate, combined with a high-strength filament-wound composite motor case.

Motor development is iterative, with each generation of full-scale motor anchored against static-fire test data and validated using USCRPL's internally developed simulation toolchain, FlightOn. In October 2023, the Shockwave motor - the full-scale propulsion system developed for the Aftershock program - was static-fired and recorded as the most powerful solid-propellant motor ever fired by a student team and the most powerful composite-case motor fired by amateurs.

== Traveler program ==
The Traveler series comprised the lab's first efforts to achieve spaceflight:

- Traveler I (2013): An early full-scale 8-inch diameter, single-stage vehicle. Parts of the solid-fuel propellant were improperly cast, causing the motor to fail approximately 3.5 seconds after launch.
- Traveler II (2014): Incorporated improvements in composite motor cases and structures but experienced structural failures in flight, with the vehicle exploding at approximately 4,000 ft.
- Traveler III (2018): Launched from the Black Rock Desert, Nevada. An operational communications error led to launch without the avionics system armed, resulting in ballistic reentry and loss of the vehicle.
- Traveler IV (2019): Launched on April 21, 2019, from Spaceport America, New Mexico. Post-flight analysis of onboard data estimated an apogee of 339,800 ft (103.6 km) ± 16,500 ft, with 90% confidence of exceeding the Kármán line. The vehicle achieved a maximum velocity of approximately Mach 5.1 and was recovered successfully despite extensive thermal damage.

== Notable launches ==
=== Fathom II ===
On March 4, 2017, USCRPL launched Fathom II from Spaceport America in New Mexico. The rocket reached an altitude of 144,000 ft (44 km) and a velocity of Mach 4, setting the collegiate altitude record at the time and more than doubling the previous student record set by Delft Aerospace Rocket Engineering.

The mission was a systems qualification flight ahead of a future spaceshot attempt. The rocket was recovered intact approximately 6.8 mi (10.9 km) from the launchpad after descent under parachute.

=== Traveler IV ===
Traveler IV was launched on April 21, 2019, from Spaceport America, New Mexico. Space.com described the achievement as completing "a decade-long informal competition among engineering schools worldwide to create the first university rocket to achieve spaceflight." Post-flight reconstruction estimated an apogee of approximately 339,800 ft (103.6 km) ± 16,500 ft, with 90% confidence of exceeding the Kármán line.

Post-flight inspection documented complete loss of external paint and erosion along fin leading edges due to aerodynamic heating. The recovery system deployed successfully, enabling intact retrieval of avionics hardware. The American Institute of Aeronautics and Astronautics (AIAA) Los Angeles–Las Vegas section formally honored USCRPL for the achievement.

The Communications of the ACM noted that while the apogee analysis was well-documented internally, it had not at that time undergone independent external evaluation.

=== Aftershock II ===
Aftershock II was launched on October 20, 2024, from the Black Rock Desert in Nevada. USCRPL reported a reconstructed apogee of 470,400 ft (143.3 km) ± 27,300 ft, based on post-flight analysis of onboard inertial measurement unit data, surpassing the previous amateur altitude record of 380,000 ft set in 2004 by the CSXT GoFast rocket.

The same analysis reported a maximum velocity of approximately 5,283 ft/s (Mach 5.5), surpassing the previous amateur speed record held by GoFast (5,019 ft/s). The 13-foot-tall, 330-pound vehicle broke the sound barrier within two seconds of launch and reached peak altitude approximately 92 seconds after liftoff. The vehicle also featured the most powerful solid-propellant motor ever fired by students and the most powerful composite-case motor made by amateurs.

Aviation Week placed the achievement in the context of a broader rise in advanced student rocketry, noting that USCRPL had "largely figured it out on their own" and accumulated institutional knowledge across graduating classes in ways uncommon among university organizations. The Los Angeles public radio outlet LAist also reported on the record.

Third-party rocketry community reviewers noted that GPS signal was lost near apogee, meaning the peak altitude is extrapolated from accelerometer data rather than directly confirmed by GPS tracking.

=== Daybreak ===
Daybreak was launched on April 18, 2026, from the Black Rock Desert, Nevada, carrying onboard payloads including a composite boattail aeroshell component developed by Cambium Composites (El Segundo, California). USCRPL reported that the vehicle surpassed the Kármán line and was fully recovered intact, and stated this marked the first time a U.S. student team had launched and recovered a rocket as a space payload provider. Detailed altitude and flight data had not been publicly released as of May 2026.

== Suborbital flights ==
Date and time (UTC)	Vehicle	Identifier	Launch Site		Operator	
Date and time (UTC)	Payload	University	Type	Function	Launch	Recovery
Date and time (UTC)	Details					
2026
18-Apr-2026	(United States) Daybreak	DB	(United States) Black Rock Desert, NV		(United States) USCRPL	
18-Apr-2026	(United States) ERAU, (United States) ASU	(United States) USC	Suborbital	Experimental	Success	Success
18-Apr-2026	Apogee: >100 km (reported); Velocity: TBD					
2025
18-Oct-2025	(United States) Malibu	MB	(United States) Mojave Desert, CA		(United States) USCRPL	
18-Oct-2025	-	(United States) USC	Suborbital	Experimental	Success	Success
18-Oct-2025	Apogee: 46,350 ft (14.13 km); Velocity: 2,302 ft/s (702 m/s)					
2024
20-Oct-2024	(United States) Aftershock II	AS2	(United States) Black Rock Desert, NV		(United States) USCRPL	
20-Oct-2024	-	(United States) USC	Suborbital	Experimental	Success	Success
20-Oct-2024	Apogee: 143.3 km (470,000 ft); Velocity: 5,283 ft/s (1,610 m/s)					
20-Apr-2024	(United States) Aftershock I	AS1	(United States) Black Rock Desert, NV		(United States) USCRPL	
20-Apr-2024	-	(United States) USC	Suborbital	Experimental	Failure	Failure
20-Apr-2024	Failure Type: CATO; Cause: Avionics					
2023
01-Apr-2023	(United States) Fireball	FB	(United States) Spaceport America, NM		(United States) USCRPL	
01-Apr-2023	-	(United States) USC	Suborbital	Experimental	Success	Failure
01-Apr-2023	Failure Type: Unrecovered; Cause: Avionics					
2022
23-Apr-2022	(United States) Jawbone	JB	(United States) Mojave Desert, CA		(United States) USCRPL	
23-Apr-2022	-	(United States) USC	Suborbital	Experimental	Success	Success
23-Apr-2022	Apogee: 41,300 ft (12.6 km); Velocity: Mach 1.717					
2021
2020
10-Apr-2020	(United States) CTRL+V	CV	(United States) Mojave Desert, CA		(United States) USCRPL	
10-Apr-2020	-	(United States) USC	Suborbital	Experimental	Success	Success
10-Apr-2020	Apogee: 12 km (39,000 ft); Velocity: 2,009 ft/s (612 m/s)					
2019
24-Jan-2019	(United States) Poise	PS	(United States) Mojave Desert, CA		(United States) USCRPL	
24-Jan-2019	-	(United States) USC	Suborbital	Experimental	Success	Success
24-Jan-2019	Apogee: 9 km (30,000 ft); Velocity: N/A					
21-Apr-2019	(United States) Traveler IV	T4	(United States) Spaceport America, NM		(United States) USCRPL	
21-Apr-2019		(United States) USC	Suborbital	Experimental	Success	Success
21-Apr-2019	Apogee: 103.6 km (340,000 ft); Velocity: 4,988 ft/s (1,520 m/s)					
2018
29-Sep-2018	(United States) Traveler III	T3	(United States) Black Rock Desert, NV		(United States) USCRPL	
29-Sep-2018	-	(United States) USC	Suborbital	Experimental	Success	Failure
29-Sep-2018	Failure Type: Ballistic reentry Cause: Operational					
2017
04-Mar-2017	(United States) Fathom II	F2	(United States) Spaceport America, NM		(United States) USCRPL	
04-Mar-2017	-	(United States) USC	Suborbital	Experimental	Success	Success
04-Mar-2017	Apogee: 44 km (144,000 ft); Velocity: 3,804 ft/s (1,159 m/s)					
2016
16-Apr-2016	(United States) Fathom I	F1	(United States) Spaceport America, NM		(United States) USCRPL	
16-Apr-2016	-	(United States) USC	Suborbital	Experimental	Failure	Failure
16-Apr-2016	Failure Type: CATO; Cause: Motor					

== Notable alumni ==
Several USCRPL alumni have gone on to prominent roles in the commercial space industry. Tim Ellis (BS/MS, USC Viterbi 2012/2013) and Jordan Noone (BS, USC Viterbi 2014) both held leadership positions at USCRPL before co-founding Relativity Space in 2015, a company focused on 3D-printed launch vehicles that raised over $1.3 billion from investors. More broadly, alumni from USCRPL have taken roles at NASA, SpaceX, Blue Origin, and other aerospace organizations.

== Documentary films ==
USCRPL has been the subject of several short documentary films released on YouTube:

- Space or Nothing (2019), directed by Joseph DeRose, follows the team's journey from the Traveler III failure through the Traveler IV launch attempt. The film documents the lead-up to the April 2019 spaceshot and was released shortly after the successful flight.
- Fireball (2023), directed by Alexandra Miller and Thomas Rudden, follows USCRPL students in the period after Traveler IV as the team works to return to spaceshot capability, culminating in the April 2023 Fireball launch attempt.
- Aftershock (2025), directed by Collin Nelson, is a short documentary (16 minutes) covering the Aftershock II campaign and its record-breaking October 2024 launch.

== In the press ==
USCRPL and its launches have been covered by mainstream and specialist media across multiple milestones. Wired covered both the Fathom II record (2017) and the Traveler IV spaceshot (2019). IEEE Spectrum profiled the lab as early as 2013. The Aftershock II record was reported by Aviation Week, Space.com, ABC7 Los Angeles, the New York Post, and LAist, among others. MathWorks featured the lab as a case study in student engineering education.

== See also ==
- Amateur rocketry
- Kármán line
- Spaceport America
- CSXT GoFast -previous amateur altitude record holder
- Delft Aerospace Rocket Engineering -comparable European student rocketry group
- Relativity Space -company co-founded by USCRPL alumni
- Jordan Noone
- Tim Ellis (engineer)
