= Reaction Research Society =

Amateur experimental rocket group

The Reaction Research Society (not to be confused with UK-based Reaction Engines) is the oldest continuously operating amateur experimental rocket group in the United States. Founded by George James on 6 January 1943, originally as the Southern California Rocket Society, the organization's name was changed to the Glendale Rocket Society two months later. Ultimately, the society changed its name to the Reaction Research Society around 1946 to encompass more aspects of propulsion beyond rocketry, however most research and experimentation at the RRS has been with solid, liquid and hybrid rocketry.

The RRS is an educational non-profit group in California based in Los Angeles. The RRS has owned and operated a private testing site, the Mojave Test Area (MTA), north of Edwards Air Force Base and California City in the Mojave desert since 1955.

On September 20, 2003, The Reaction Research Society was part of a team that "conducted the first known flight test of a powered liquid-propellant aerospike engine."

== See also ==
- High-power rocketry
- Amateur & Experimental rocketry
- Friends of Amateur Rocketry
