= United Kingdom Rocketry Association =

The United Kingdom Rocketry Association (UKRA) is an enabling body set up to promote and represent high power, medium power, and model rocketry in the United Kingdom for educational, recreational, and amateur research purposes. UKRA is also the specialist body to the BMFA (British Model Flying Association) with responsibilities for High Power Rocketry, and is the United Kingdom body recognized by the Civil Aviation Authority.

== Background ==
Formed in 1996 at a meeting of UK rocketry societies and clubs established at that time, as well as amateur rocketeers, the formation meeting took place at the International Rocket Week at Largs in Scotland. UKRA works through the current UKRA affiliated rocketry clubs and societies. These rocketry clubs and societies organise rocket launches, which take place on a monthly basis at their launch sites. UKRA liaises with government bodies on behalf of UK rocketeers and, through its certification programme and network of Range Safety Officers, ensures safe launches. UKRA has safety rules to ensure that rocket launching takes place in clear skies, and care is taken to ensure that the planned trajectory avoids any passing aircraft. In addition, Notice to Airmen (NOTAM's) are issued to pilots of aircraft notifying them of the rocket launching site and times of rocketry activity. UKRA also has a reciprocal certification arrangement with the U.S. equivalent, the Tripoli Rocketry Association (TRA).

UKRA also provides, through the BMFA, 3rd party liability insurance of up to £25 million, which is included in Full UKRA membership and allows rocket motors of up to M-class (10,240 Newton seconds total impulse) to be used with the correct certification. UKRA's Large Rocket Scheme caters for rockets exceeding 10,240 Newton seconds total impulse. UKRA also maintains a comprehensive set of tables of UK amateur and experimental rocketry records, and a procedure to enable records to be verified.

== Youth programmes ==
With the Model Achievement Programme, UKRA extended their activities into schools and youth groups, in an effort to popularise the hobby, and provide encouragement and inspiration to future generations of rocketeers. It was instrumental in starting UKROC (United Kingdom Rocketry Challenge). This is a challenge open to 11- to 18-year-olds where teams of 3-6 students with an adult supervisor design, build and launch a model rocket with a specific mission criteria. Details of the competition can be found on the UKROC website. In 2009, the winning school was Royal Liberty School, Romford. In May, they flew out to Washington DC to fly off against the winners of the Team America Rocketry Challenge competition run by The National Association of Rocketry [NAR] and Aerospace Industries Association. The British team was successful for the second year running.

== Media appearances ==
They have featured twice on British TV Programme Top Gear, first in the Winter Olympics Special in which they help send a Rocket Powered Leyland Mini Cooper down a Ski Jump, and secondly in a later Episode when they help turn a Three-Wheeled Reliant Robin into a Space Shuttle.
