= Xyla Foxlin =

American engineer, entrepreneur, YouTuber

- Foxlin in 2026
- Born: Cleveland, Ohio, U.S
- Education: Lexington High School (MA); Case Western Reserve University (B.S.E.)
- Occupations: Engineer; entrepreneur; YouTube personality
- Awards: Sloan Science Prize in Documentary; Forbes 30 Under 30

YouTube information
- Channel: Xyla Foxlin
- Years active: 2020–present
- Genre: Engineering
- Subscribers: 614 thousand
- Views: 59.57 million
- Last updated: 12 October 2026
- Website: www.xylafoxlin.com

Xyla Foxlin (/ˈzaɪ.lə/) is an American engineer, entrepreneur and YouTuber. She graduated from Case Western Reserve University in 2019 with a B.S.E. in General Engineering focusing in Mechatronics and Creative Technology. Foxlin provides YouTube tutorial videos, guiding viewers through technical projects. She served as Executive Director for 501(c)(3) organization Beauty and the Bolt which aims to lower the barrier to entry for women and minorities in STEM fields. She also invented Parihug, a huggable teddy bear that sends a signal to its twin over the Internet.

== Biography ==
Foxlin grew up in the Boston area and attended Lexington High School. As a sophomore, she found part-time work by using a hyperlocal job search website called HelpAroundTown. She was captain of the school's robotics team in her junior and senior years. She attended Case Western Reserve University and majored in mechanical and aerospace engineering where she was described in a magazine as a "robotics whiz kid". She was president of the college's robotics mining team. While in Cleveland, she entered a beauty contest and won the title for Miss Greater Cleveland; her skill was playing a violin using a Tesla coil that she developed. In 2018, Foxlin was named as one of Crain's Cleveland Business's most Notable Women in Technology. She subsequently moved to Los Angeles in 2020.

In 2017, when she was doxxed and harassed by an anonymous Twitter follower, she subpoenaed Twitter to find the identity of her harasser; it turned out she was a woman and fellow robotics student that Foxlin had once mentored.

== Career ==
=== Parihug ===
Foxlin invented a huggable teddy bear called Parihug which features two matching bears; each bear is "stuffed with wireless and Bluetooth technology" so that when it is hugged, it sends a signal to its twin over the Internet so that a person with the other bear will feel it vibrate softly and get a message about the hug. The toy attracted sufficient attention so that it became a startup firm. With co-founder Harshita Gupta, the stuffed animals won the SXSW Tech Fest Reader's Choice award. She also won the university's Spartan Challenge Entrepreneurial Competition in its development. The product was ultimately never released, with security concerns noted in a Kickstarter post ending the project, with Xyla returning to finish her university degree and subsequently published a description for how to build a do it yourself Parihug.

=== Beauty and the Bolt ===
With a classmate, she launched a 501-c(3) non-profit called Beauty and the Bolt to empower women and minorities to excel in engineering. The website was described as an "online village that is designed to reduce the barrier to entry into makerspaces". It offers video tutorials about 3-D printing, cutting with lasers, soldering, and other engineering-related tasks. Forbes contributor Amy Blankson described her as an inspiring role model who has been working to close the "STEM gender gap" by utilizing modern media.

My big thing is that femininity and engineering are not mutually exclusive. I’m still the only one in a dress at design reviews or the only one wearing all pink in the shop. We should be teaching our girls that it’s OK to like princesses and power tools.

— Foxlin in Cleveland Magazine in 2017.

=== YouTube ===
Foxlin designs and builds projects requiring woodworking and engineering skills, and posts YouTube videos about how she went about building them. For example, in 2021, at the request of a fellow YouTuber, Derek Muller, she built a model car that uses a gear and propeller system to apply drive from a treadmill to make it travel faster than the treadmill was running; she was able to build the vehicle after learning that the key design detail is the vehicle speed ratio, which describes the optimal way to transmit power from the wheels to spin the propeller. She launched a tiara into space using weather balloon technology, with cameras on the balloon to record the flight and send back data to her controller. The camera, but not the tiara, was recovered hundreds of miles away.

In May 2021, she built a high powered wood rocket in five days. She built a kayak out of clear fiberglass and lit it internally with a plethora of LED colored lights, so her craft, which she nicknamed Rainbowt, lights up on the water even at night. In another video, Foxlin went on a cross country road trip through the southern and western United States, collecting a piece of wood from trees grown in each of the states, which she machined into wooden puzzle pieces of a map of the country. In 2021, Foxlin designed a bulletproof gown and then shot bullets at the gown to see if the kevlar materials in the gown were effective at stopping the bullets. At Christmas time in 2021, along with Joe Barnard, she launched a seven foot tall Christmas tree 300 feet into the air, with a "rocket stuffed up its ... bottom".

=== Flying and Pilot Mental Health Advocacy ===
Foxlin posing with an airplane

Foxlin has a stated affinity for flying, with her first solo flight at 17 years old and subsequently earning her private pilot licence. However, when a change in her birth control led to depression, the Federal Aviation Administration revoked the necessary medical certificate of her pilot's license. Foxlin began campaigning for the Mental Health In Aviation Act and argued that the current approach made it less likely for commercial and private pilots to seek mental health care, for fear of endangering their careers. Foxlin's appeal to the FAA was successful in 2025 and she was issued a special medical certificate, and she subsequently flew across the continential United States in her Cessna 140.

== Recognition ==
In 2021, a 3D printed statue of her, along with other women leaders in aviation and aerospace-related fields, was displayed at Dallas Love Field airport in Texas as a preview of an exhibition called #IfThenSheCan – The Exhibit. Foxlin's 3D printed statue was also displayed at the Smithsonian Institution in Washington, D.C., in March, 2022 within the full #IfThenSheCan – The Exhibit, featuring 120 3D printed statues displayed in celebration of Women's History Month.

In December 2025, Foxlin was named a member of the Forbes 30 Under 30 Class of 2026 in the Social Media category. Also in December 2025, Foxlin was awarded the Sloan Science Prize in Documentary from the Independent Media Initiative and the Alfred P. Sloan Foundation.

Foxlin was awarded the Aviation Inspiration Award from the Living Legends of Aviation in January 2026.
