= Amateur rocketry =

Hobby in which participants build rockets and associated systems

Amateur rocketry, sometimes known as experimental rocketry or amateur experimental rocketry, is a hobby in which participants experiment with fuels and make their own rocket motors, launching a wide variety of types and sizes of rockets. Amateur rocketeers have been responsible for significant research into hybrid rocket motors, and have built and flown a variety of solid, liquid, and hybrid propellant motors.

== History ==
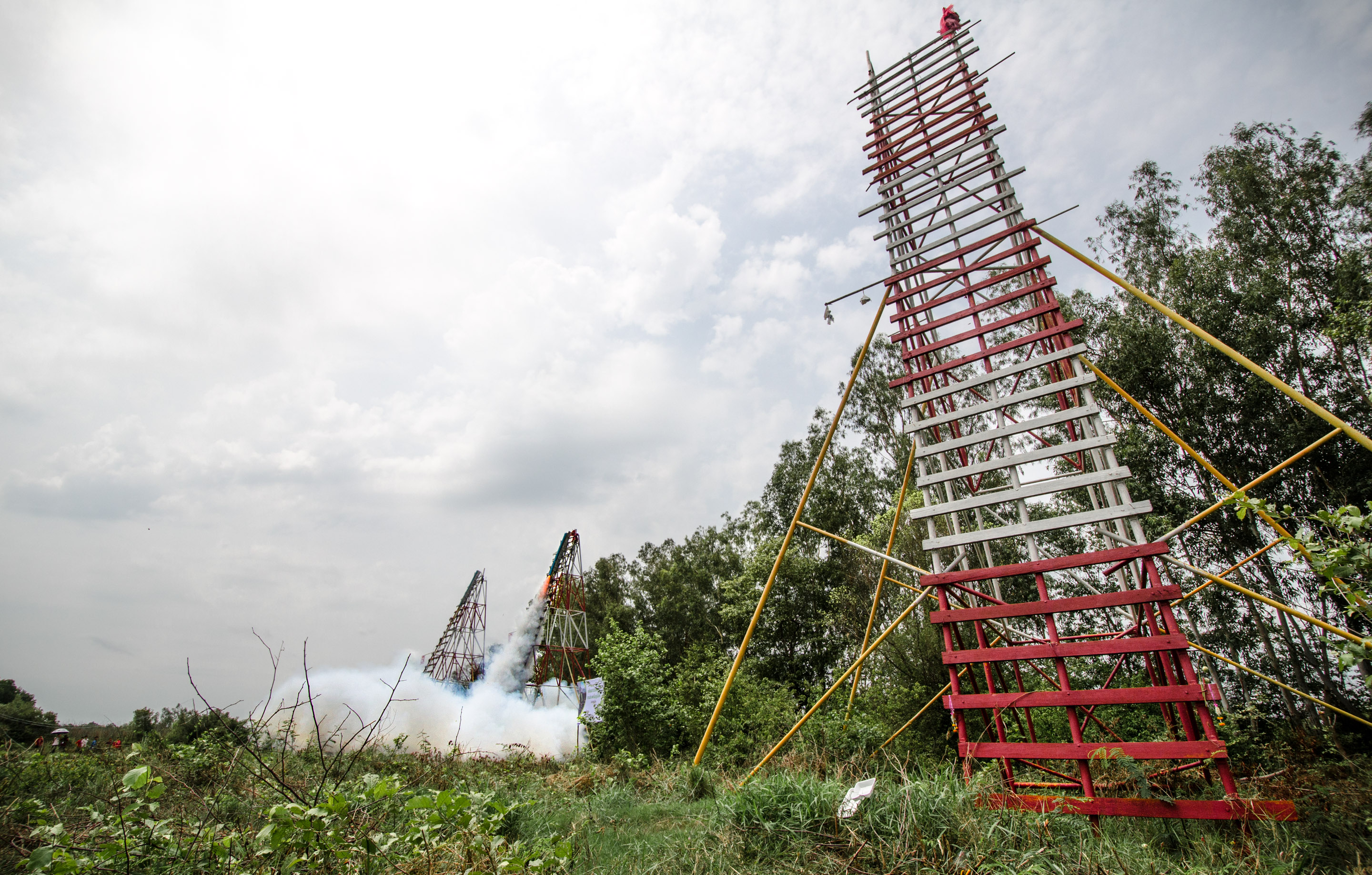
Rocket Festivals are an old tradition at the beginning of the wet season in certain parts of Laos and Thailand

An amateur rocket scientist describing the setup of a hybrid fuel rocket engine test at Amateur Experimental Rocketry, Dhaka, at American International University-Bangladesh

Amateur rocketry was an especially popular hobby in the late 1950s and early 1960s following the launch of Sputnik, as described in Homer Hickam's 1998 memoir Rocket Boys.

One of the first organizations set up in the US to engage in amateur rocketry was the Pacific Rocket Society established in California in the early 1950s. The group did their research on rockets from a launch site deep in the Mojave Desert.

In the summer of 1956, 17-year-old Jimmy Blackmon of Charlotte, North Carolina, built a 6-foot rocket in his basement. The rocket was designed to be powered by combined liquid nitrogen, gasoline, and liquid oxygen. On learning that Blackmon wanted to launch his rocket from a nearby farm, the Civil Aeronautics Administration notified the U.S. Army. Blackmon's rocket was examined at Redstone Arsenal and eventually grounded on the basis that some of the material he had used was too weak to control the flow and mixing of the fuel.

Interest in the rocketry hobby was spurred to a great extent by the publication of a Scientific American article in June 1957 that described the design, propellant formulations, and launching techniques utilized by typical amateur rocketry groups of the time (including the Reaction Research Society of California). The subsequent publication, in 1960, of a book entitled Rocket Manual for Amateurs by Bertrand R. Brinley provided even more detailed information regarding the hobby, and further contributed to its burgeoning popularity.

At this time, amateur rockets nearly always employed either black powder, zinc-sulfur (also called "micrograin"), or rocket candy (often referred to as "caramel candy") propellant mixtures. However, such amateur rockets can be dangerous because noncommercial rocket motors may fail more often than commercial rocket motors if not correctly engineered. An appalling accident rate led individuals such as G. Harry Stine and Vernon Estes to make model rocketry a safe and widespread hobby by developing and publishing the National Association of Rocketry Model Rocket Safety Code, and by commercially producing safe, professionally designed and manufactured model rocket motors. Currently, NAR forbids amateur rocketry at their launches, only allowing certified motors, but Tripoli allows homemade motors, which they designate as research motors, to be flown at their launches.

As knowledge of modern advances in composite and liquid propellants became more available to the public, it became possible to develop amateur motors with greater safety. Hobbyists were no longer dependent on dangerous packed-powder mixtures that could be delicate and unpredictable in handling and performance.

The Reaction Research Society conducts complex amateur rocket projects, utilizing solid, liquid, and hybrid propellant technologies. The Tripoli Rocketry Association sanctions some amateur activities, which they call "research rocketry," provided certain safety guidelines are followed, and provided the motors are of relatively standard design.

Projects such as Sugar Shot to Space attempt to launch rockets using "rocket candy" as a propellant.

== Records ==
An amateur spaceshot refers to a rocket launch by non-commercial / non-military entities that successfully reached or exceeded the Kármán line (100 km / 328,084 ft), the internationally recognized boundary of space.

Successful Amateur Spaceshots
Date	Organization	Vehicle	Location	Maximum Altitude (AMSL)	Maximum Velocity	Comments
April 30, 2026	(New Zealand) Ethan Kosoof (NZRA)	Meraki III	Mt White Station, New Zealand	111 Km	~1,800 m/s	Current velocity record-holder.; Lowest impulse to space < 53,000 N-s
April 18, 2026	(United States) USC Rocket Propulsion Laboratory (USCRPL)	Daybreak	Black Rock Desert, NV, USA	102 km	1,433 m/s	First amateur payload mission.
April 19, 2025	(New Zealand) Ethan Kosoof (NZRA)	Meraki II	Mt. White Station, New Zealand	122 km	1,664 m/s	
October 20, 2024	(United States) USC Rocket Propulsion Laboratory (USCRPL)	Aftershock II	Black Rock Desert, NV, USA	143 km	1,610 m/s	Current altitude record-holder.
April 21, 2019	(United States) USC Rocket Propulsion Laboratory (USCRPL)	Traveler IV	Spaceport America, NM, USA	104 km	1,513 m/s	First successful student spaceshot.
May 17, 2004	(United States) Civilian Space eXploration Team (CSXT)	GoFast	Black Rock Desert, NV, USA	116 km	1,530 m/s	First successful amateur spaceshot.

== Common propellants ==
Amateur rocketeers use a variety of propellants. The most common ones are rocket candy, and Ammonium perchlorate composite propellant (APCP). Rocket candy is a composite propellant made by mixing some form of sugar, often sucrose, sorbitol, dextrose, and fructose, with potassium nitrate. APCP is typically made with a powdered metal (typically aluminum), HTPB, and various burn rate catalysts.

== Amateur liquid rocketry ==
There are many organizations (most collegiate) actively developing and launching amateur liquid rockets. None, however, have flown past the Kármán line. Liquid-propellant powered rockets require highly complex, precise, and expensive systems; as such they are less accessible for the average rocketry hobbyist than their solid-motor counterparts. Collegiate programs benefit from corporate sponsorships and fundraising efforts to meet these needs. The danger of hazardous and/or cryogenic rocket fuels and oxidizers add to this difficulty.

Amateur liquid rockets often employ RP-1/Jet-A (kerosene) or ethanol as fuel; and many use liquid oxygen or nitrous oxide as oxidizers. They often use blow-down, pressure-fed propulsion systems to pressurize propellants for the sake of simplicity, but some organizations are actively researching electric or gas-generator cycle pumps.

Highest Amateur Liquid Rocket Launches
Date	Organization	Vehicle	Apogee (AGL)	Propulsion	Comments
August 20, 2026	(Canada) Waterloo Rocketry (UW)	Polaris	19.4 km	Ethanol/Nitrous Oxide, self-pressurizing	Recovered; World record for highest apogee of an amateur liquid rocket; World record for highest apogee of a recovered amateur liquid rocket; Successfully demonstrated active roll control with canards
April 11, 2026	(United States) Yellow Jacket Space Program (GT)	Vespula	17.2 km	RP-1/Liquid Oxygen, controlled pressure-fed	Unrecovered; Held world record from April 11, 2026 to August 20, 2026
April 16, 2023	(United States) Rocket Development Lab (ERAU)	Deneb	14.5 km	Jet-A/Liquid Oxygen, blow-down	Unrecovered; Held world record from April 16, 2023 to April 11, 2026
May 15, 2026	(United States) Yellow Jacket Space Program (GT)	Felicette	14.4 km	Isopropyl Alcohol/Nitrous Oxide, self-pressurizing	Unrecovered; World record for highest apogee of an amateur liquid rocket without a nosecone; World record for highest apogee of an amateur nitrous/IPA rocket
August 21, 2025	(Canada) Waterloo Rocketry (UW)	Aurora	11.6 km	Ethanol/Nitrous Oxide, self-pressurizing	Unrecovered
June 20, 2026	(United Kingdom) Project Sunride (UoS)	Black Mamba	10.0 km	Isopropyl Alcohol/Nitrous Oxide, self-pressurizing	Unrecovered; World record for highest amateur regeneratively cooled engine; First amateur dual pass regeneratively cooled flight engine; Currently holds the European Liquid Altitude Record
April 19, 2025	(United States) SDSU Rocket Project	Aetherios	9.3 km	Ethanol/Liquid Oxygen, pressure-fed	Unrecovered
January 20, 2024	(United States) Yellow Jacket Space Program (GT)	Darcy II	9.2 km	Isopropyl Alcohol/Nitrous Oxide, self-pressurizing	
June 15, 2024	(United Kingdom) Project Sunride (UoS)	Desert Winds	8.2 km	Isopropyl Alcohol/Nitrous Oxide, self-pressurizing	Unrecovered; First liquid-fuelled rocket launched by a UK student team
March 18, 2023	(United States) UCLA Rocket Project	Phoenix	6.8 km	Isopropyl Alcohol/Liquid Oxygen, blow-down	Recovered; Held world record from March 18, 2023 to April 16, 2023
March 16, 2025	(United States) Rocket Development Lab (ERAU)	Deneb 2: Electric Boogaloo	6.4 km	Jet-A/Liquid Oxygen, blow-down	Recovered with damage
August 6, 2022	(United States) Yellow Jacket Space Program (GT)	Darcy I	6.1 km	Isopropyl Alcohol/Nitrous Oxide, self-pressurizing	
August 20, 2024	(Canada) Waterloo Rocketry	Borealis	5.9 km	Ethanol/Nitrous Oxide, self-pressurizing	Recovered; First bi-liquid designed, built, and flown in Canada
May 29, 2021	(United States) UCLA Rocket Project	Ambition	5.8 km	Isopropyl Alcohol/Liquid Oxygen, blow-down	Recovered; Held world record from May 29, 2021 to March 18, 2023
November 1, 2025	(United States) Walter Lohmueller	Sun Eater	5.6 km	Isopropyl Alcohol/Nitrous Oxide, blow-down	Fully Recovered; Highest High School built and flown liquid rocket; Solo project
March 1, 2025	(United States) Space Enterprise at Berkeley (UCB)	Eureka II	4.9 km	Propane/Liquid Oxygen, pressure-fed	
March 29, 2025	(United States) Boston University Rocket Propulsion Group (BU)	Icarus	3.9 km	Liquid bipropellant	

=== Regeneratively cooled thrust chambers ===
Since 2016, some collegiate organizations have tackled significantly harder challenges by designing reusable thrust chamber utilizing regenerative cooling. Student competions like Race2Space have been specifically focusing on static fire testing of regeneratively cooled thrust chambers designed by students. Even though many chamber have been hotfired, because of the added complexity of the challenge, very few have been integrated into a launch vehicule for flight.

Liquid bi-propellant regeneratively cooled engine flights
Date	Organization	Vehicle	Apogee (AGL)	Propulsion	Chamber material	Comments
October 17, 2026	(Austria) Aerospace Team Graz	HARPIA	9.196 km	Isopropyl Alcohol/Nitrous Oxide, pressure-fed	Inconel 718 (3D printed)	Recovered nominally; Flight at EuRoC 2026; First Austrian regeneratively cooled engine to fly ever
August 19, 2026	(Canada) SIRIUS (UdS)	Zenith	3.9 km	Isopropyl Alcohol/Nitrous Oxide, self-pressurizing	Aluminum alloy (3D printed)	Recovered nominally; First Canadian regeneratively cooled engine to fly ever
June 20, 2026	(United Kingdom) Project Sunride (UoS)	Black Mamba	10.0 km	Isopropyl Alcohol/Nitrous Oxide, self-pressurizing	AlSi10Mg (3D Printed)	Unrecovered; World record for highest amateur regeneratively cooled engine; First amateur dual pass regeneratively cooled flight engine; Currently holds the European Liquid Altitude Record
April 19, 2025	(United States) SDSU Rocket Project	Aetherios	9.3 km	Ethanol/Liquid Oxygen, pressure-fed	GRCop-42 (3D printed)	Unrecovered
October 14, 2024	(Germany) WARR Rocketry (TMU)	EX-4B	1.7 km	Ethanol/Liquid Oxygen	Unknown (3D printed)	Recovered nominally on drogue chute; First european cryogenic bi-propellant rocket
June 15, 2024	(United Kingdom) Project Sunride (UoS)	Desert Winds	8.2 km	Isopropyl Alcohol/Nitrous Oxide, self-pressurizing	Aluminum alloy (3D printed)	Unrecovered; First liquid-fuelled rocket launched by a UK student team
May 14, 2023	(United States) Michigan Aeronautical Science Association (MASA)	Clementine	2.4 km	RP-1/Liquid Oxygen, blow-down	Copper linner with aluminum jacket	Recovered, ballistic descent; Largest american student-built rocket
February 1, 2020	(United States) San Diego State University Rocket Project (SDSU RP)	Lady Elizabeth	4.0 km	Methane/Liquid Oxygen, blow-down	Unknown	Recovered nominally; First student team in the world to successfully launch and recover a methalox rocket
May 1, 2016	(United States) Students for the Exploration and Development of Space at UC San Diego (UCSD)	Vulcan I	1.2 km	RP-1/Liquid Oxygen, blow-down	Inconel 718 (3D printed)	Recovered, crash at landing; First student team in the world to successfully fly a rocket powered by a 3D printed engine

== Notable events ==
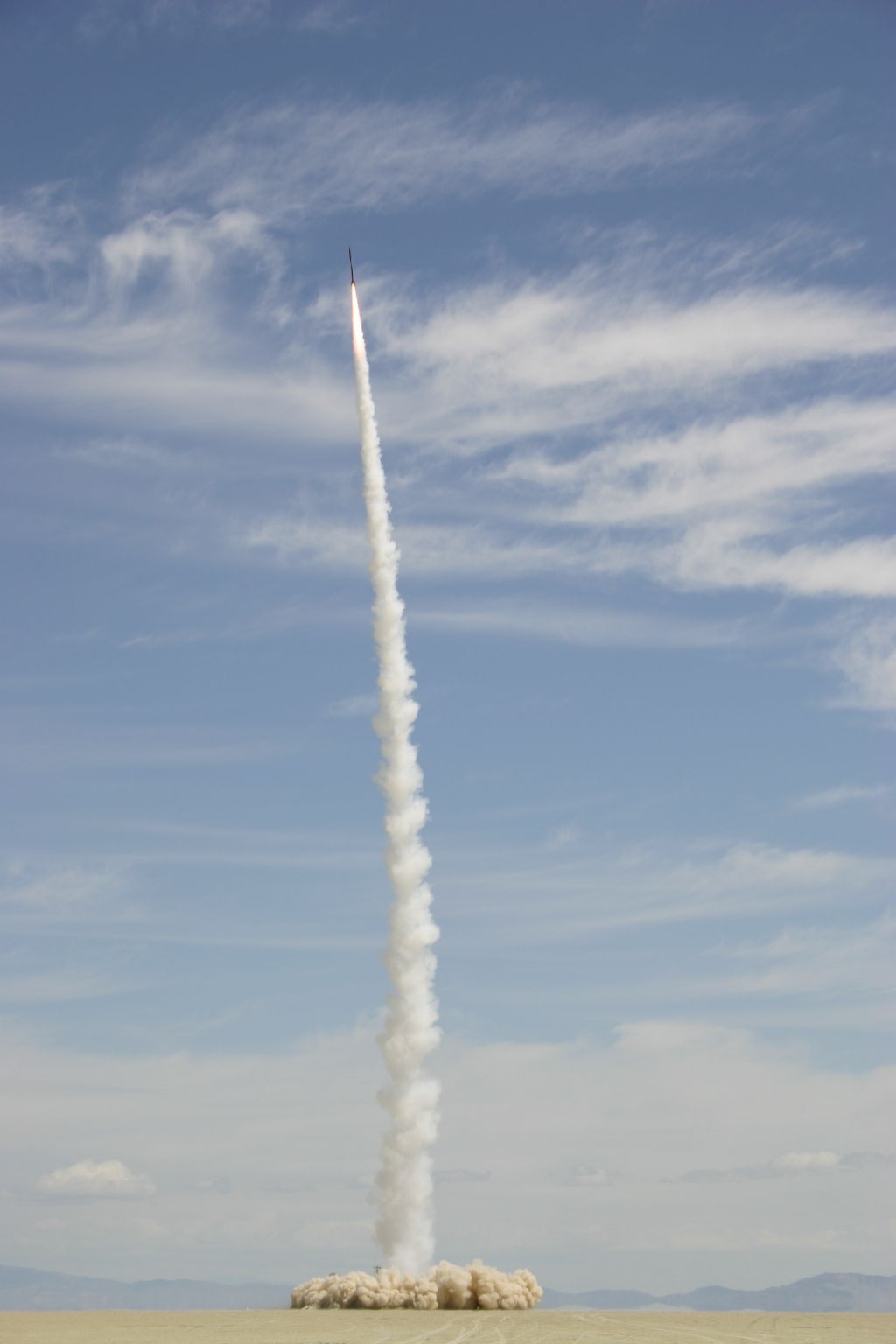
CSXT/GoFast space launch, May 17, 2004

On May 17, 2004, Civilian Space eXploration Team (CSXT) successfully launched the GoFast rocket which achieved the first officially verified flight of an amateur high-power rocket into space, achieving an altitude of 116 km (72 mi).

Prior to that, the Reaction Research Society on November 23, 1996, launched a solid-fuel rocket, designed by longtime member George Garboden, to an altitude of 80 km (50 mi) from the Black Rock Desert in Nevada.

For Series 9, Episode 4 of the BBC's Top Gear, a group of amateur rocketeers were given four and a half months to convert a Reliant Robin into a space shuttle with the assistance of an engineering firm. The shuttle used 6 x 40,960 N·s O hybrid motors for a maximum thrust of 8 metric tonnes, making it the most powerful non-governmental rocket launch in Europe. Unfortunately, the explosive bolts holding the Robin to the external tank failed to separate, causing it to crash into a nearby hill.

On 22 March 2007, Embry-Riddle Aeronautical University, Daytona Beach launched the two-staged Icarus rocket from NASA Wallops Flight Facility in Virginia. Icarus was built by students from the Embry-Riddle Future Space Explorers and Developers Society. This vehicle set the world record for highest altitude launch by a student team with an apogee of 37.8 miles (200,000 feet), with a maximum velocity of Mach 4.04. It also became the first two-stage student-built sounding rocket to launch from a NASA facility.

On June 3, 2011, Copenhagen Suborbitals launched the HEAT 1X Tycho Brahe rocket with a capsule containing a test dummy. The flight had the wrong trajectory and had to be aborted in-flight (potentially the first in-flight termination of an amateur rocket based on telemetry data and radio command).

On June 23, 2013, Copenhagen Suborbitals launched the SAPPHIRE-1 rocket with active guidance. This rocket reached an altitude of 8.2 km with a horizontal error/drift of 180 m at apogee with respect to the launch platform. This launch was also a potential first in amateur rocketry as the first guided rocket launched by amateurs.

On October 16, 2015, Delft Aerospace Rocket Engineering (DARE) launched the Stratos II+ rocket from El Arenosillo, in Spain, to an altitude of 21.457 km with a successful water landing and capsule recovery. This broke the original amateur European altitude record of 12.3 km set by DARE in 2009 with the launch of Stratos I. This record stood as the European altitude record among all student rocketry programs.

On November 8, 2016, Hybrid Engine Development (HyEnD), a student team from the University of Stuttgart, Germany, launched the HEROS 3 (Hybrid Experimental ROcket Stuttgart) from Esrange Space Center in Northern Sweden to an altitude of above 30 km. By this, the European altitude record for student programs and the World record for hybrid propulsion student rockets was taken by HyEnD.

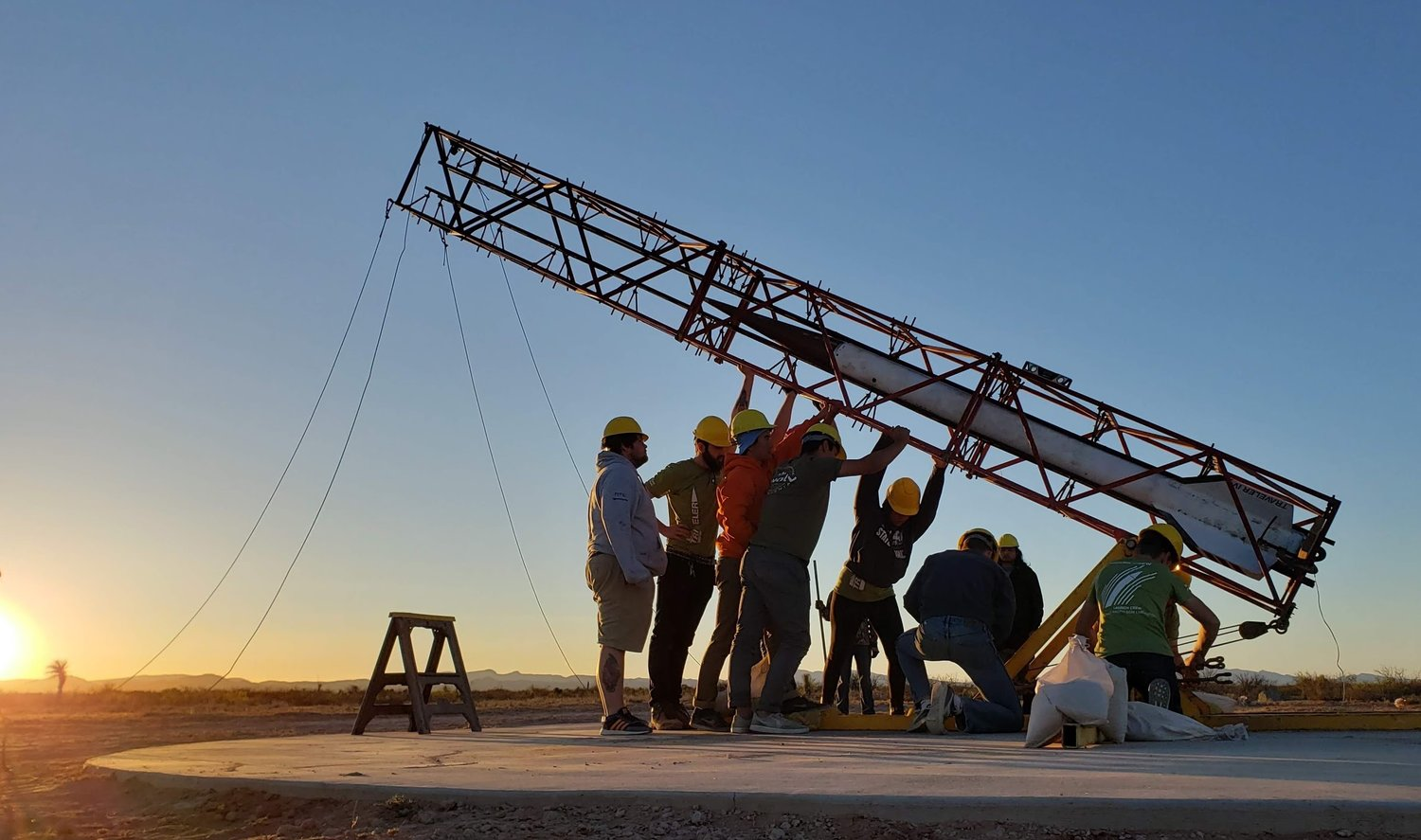
USCRPL/Traveler IV Launch, Spaceport America, NM. April 21, 2019.

On April 21, 2019, the USC Rocket Propulsion Laboratory (USCRPL) launched Traveler IV, an eight-inch diameter vehicle from Spaceport America. All of the subsystems were reported as successful, and the vehicle was fully recovered. On May 22, 2019, a whitepaper was published calculating apogee altitude of 339,800 ft ± 16,500, giving a 90% confidence that it passed the Kármán line. This makes it the highest-performing student-designed and student-manufactured rocket in the world, and the first to reach the internationally accepted definition of space. However, even though all subsystems were reported as performing nominally throughout the flight, the rocket experienced a loss of GPS data from approximately 13 seconds to 278 seconds of flight, therefore missing apogee.

On February 22, 2020 Mike Hughes, known as "Mad Mike", died after the parachute in his homemade rocket deployed prematurely and detached during liftoff.

On October 20, 2024, the USC Rocket Propulsion Laboratory (USCRPL) launched Aftershock II from the Black Rock Desert in Nevada, reaching an altitude of 143 km and exceeding the Kármán line. A post-flight whitepaper reported a maximum velocity of 1,610 m/s, as determined through double integration of acceleration data obtained from the onboard inertial measurement unit (IMU) within the avionics system.

On 19 April 2025, Ethan Kosoof of New Zealand successfully launched Meraki II, a two-stage, solid-fueled amateur rocket which he designed and engineered. The rocket reached an altitude of 121.6 kilometres, crossing the Kármán line and qualifying as a spaceflight. Launched from Mt White Station in Canterbury with the support of the Meraki Team and the New Zealand Rocketry Association, the rocket attained a maximum speed of 5,990 kilometres per hour (Mach 5.6) and maintained continuous telemetry throughout the mission. Meraki 2 represents the first amateur rocket to reach space outside of the United States, the first fully self-funded and individually designed amateur rocket to achieve spaceflight, and the fastest amateur rocket flight recorded to date.

On April 18, 2026, the USC Rocket Propulsion Laboratory (USCRPL) launched Daybreak from the Black Rock Desert in Nevada, carrying onboard payloads. USCRPL has stated that the vehicle surpassed the Kármán line; however, as of publication, the rocket’s altitude and flight data have not yet been released.

On 30 April 2026, Ethan Kosoof of New Zealand successfully launched Meraki III, a two-stage, solid-fueled amateur rocket. The booster was powered by a VT Propellants P8900 Supernova, which staged to a VT Propellants O motor for the sustainer. The combined impulse tipped the scales at sub 53,000 N-s making it the most efficient amateur space shot to date. The rocket reached an altitude of 110 kilometres, crossing the Kármán line and qualifying as a spaceflight. Launched from Mt White Station in Canterbury with the support of the Meraki Team and the New Zealand Rocketry Association, the rocket maintained continuous telemetry throughout the mission.

== See also ==
- Amateur rocket motor classification
- Civilian Space eXploration Team
- Copenhagen Suborbitals
- Delft Aerospace Rocket Engineering
- Friends of Amateur Rocketry
- High-power rocket
- Model rocket
- Reaction Research Society
- Rocketry Organization of California
- Rocket candy
- Rocket Festival
- Space Frontier Foundation
- Thermalite
- Robert Truax
