= Northern Ireland Association of Aeromodellers =

The Northern Ireland Association of Aeromodellers (NIAA) is the governing body for all British Model Flying Association (BMFA) affiliated clubs in Northern Ireland. The NIAA committee is elected by, and from representatives of the local Northern Ireland flying clubs, with an aim to promote, protect, organise and encourage model aircraft flying throughout Northern Ireland. Additionally the organisation coordinates local club events and activities, and acts as a contact and representative on their behalf to the BMFA. The NIAA is accredited in these roles by the Sports Council for Northern Ireland (SCNI), and the BMFA who are delegated by the Royal Aero Club to be responsible for all aspects of model flying in Great Britain. The BMFA is also recognised as the sole representative organisation for the sport in the UK by the Fédération Aéronautique Internationale (FAI) which is the worldwide governing body for all forms of sporting aviation, including model flying.

== Activities ==
With a full size aircraft, there are many types of model flying activities. NIAA clubs participate in the following;

- Indoor aerobatics
- Floatplane
- Helicopters
- Jet aircraft
- Gliding / soaring

Members of the NIAA were responsible for organising the 2007 International Jet Model Community Jet World Masters, an international turbine powered (jet) scale model aircraft competition.

== Affiliated Clubs ==
- North West Model Aircraft Club
