= Rocketry Organization of California =

Rocketry Organization of California (ROC) is one of the world's oldest and biggest amateur high power rocket clubs. Monthly one day launches are held the second Saturday of each month. Anyone interested in hobby rocketry is welcome, and spectators are always free.

For more information, our web page is: rocstock.org

Launches are normally held at Lucerne Dry Lake in California. The launch site is a mile west of State Route 247 and 2 miles north of State Route 18. Launches are held by permit on BLM land, and with a Certificate of Authorization from the FAA.

Launches are for hobby rockets using commercial rocket motors listed by the Office of the Stare Fire Marshal, and range from small model rockets up to very large high power rockets. With FAA approval, rockets can be launched up to 7,000 feet above ground level.

Since 1995 two annual multi day launches have been held named ROCstock in April and November, the tag line 'Love, Peace and Rockets' is used as homage to Woodstock.

The annual Tripoli launch LDRS (Large Dangerous Rocket Ships) has been hosted on 5 occasions by ROC. Four of these were at Lucerne Dry Lake, CA, (20, 29, 35, and 41) and the other (22) in Jean, NV.

The National Rocketry Association "National Sport Launch" has been hosted twice by ROC at Lucerne Dry Lake, CA.

Registered as a California non profit corporation with federal and state non-profit status.

Tripoli Prefecture: 48

NAR Section: 538

== Member and their projects ==
Wedge Oldham's projects - Nike Black Brant

Dirk Gates - Gates Brothers Rocketry
