= British Model Flying Association =

The British Model Flying Association (BMFA) is the body elected by the Royal Aero Club to be responsible for all aspects of flying model aircraft in the UK.

== History ==
The BMFA was founded in 1922 as the SMAE (Society of Model Aeronautical Engineers). The change of name took place in 1987 during the AGM of the SMAE voted to adopt a working title, the British Model Flying Association. The SMAE still exists as the parent Limited Company and its title is still used on any legal documents, however, the title BMFA is used in day-to-day usage by its members. Their Head office is currently based in Chacksfield House, Leicester, UK.

== Activities ==
Over 850 clubs in the UK are affiliated with it, with approximately 36,000 members. It has a regular magazine publication called BMFA News.

== Area bodies ==
The whole of the UK is administered from the Head Office, but locally there are 14 "Area" committees which meet periodically, and these meetings are attended by club delegates who can, through various channels open to the "Areas", propose changes or additions to the running of the sport, these are then voted upon at Council meetings held at the Head Office. If passed, the changes will be incorporated in the guidelines produced by the organisation and published in the "BMFA Handbook".
