= Civilian Space eXploration Team =

Amateur spaceflight and rocket crew

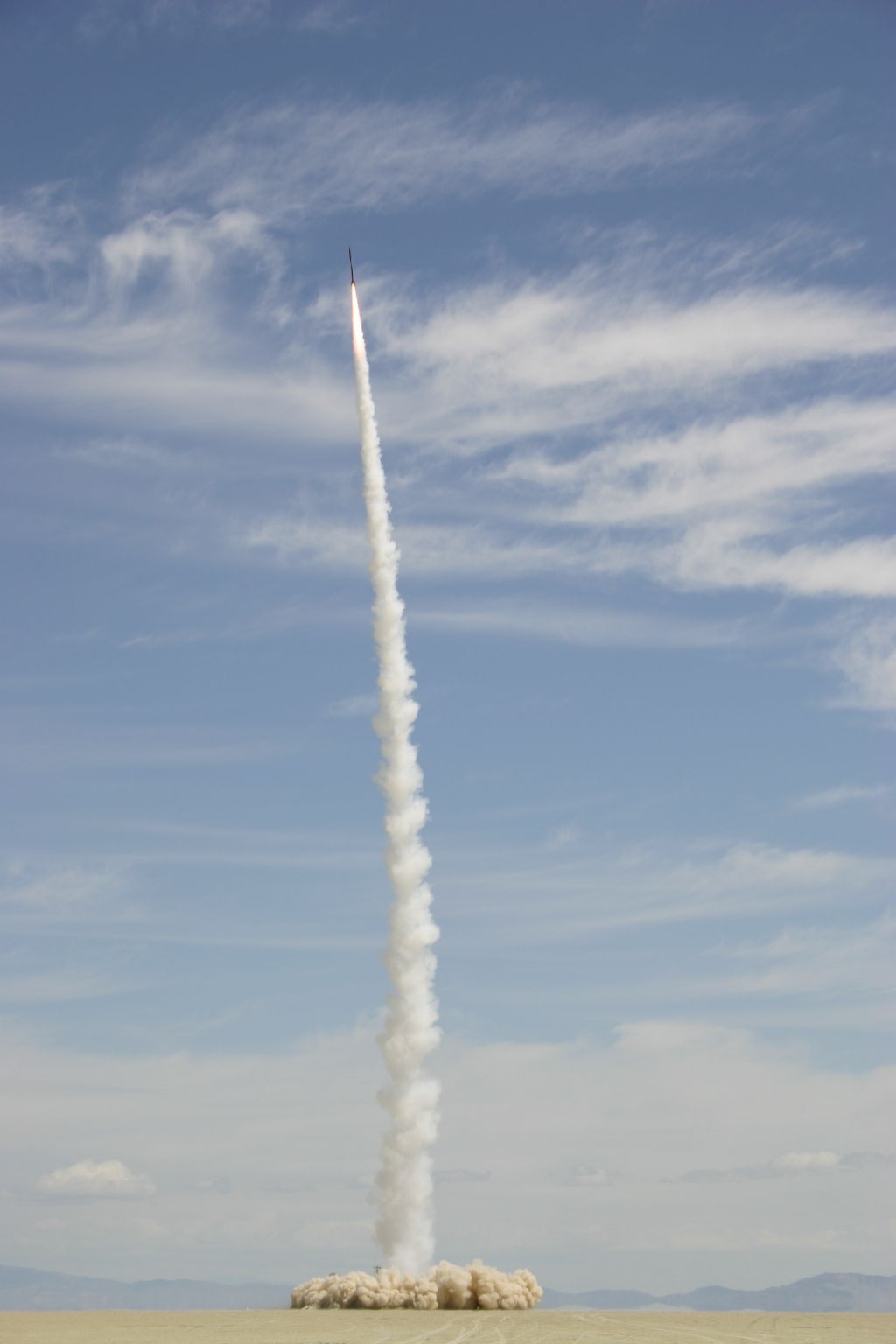
The GoFast space launch, May 17, 2004.

The Civilian Space eXploration Team, also known as the CSXT, is a team of around 30 civilians interested in private spaceflight. The team was created by Ky Michaelson. Having conducted multiple rocket launches in an attempt to establish altitude records, CSXT became the first entity to officially launch an amateur rocket into space on May 17, 2004, with the successful launch of its GoFast rocket to an altitude of 116 km (72 miles) above the surface, which was verified by FAA analysis of the team's flight data.

Prior privately funded space launches were achieved by the Orbital Sciences Pegasus, and many other amateur teams have made unverified claims of rocket flights exceeding the boundary of space.

== Team composition ==
Currently, Ky Michaelson is the CSXT program director. The CSXT's program is subdivided into three teams:

1. Rocket Design and Ground Support Equipment
2. Avionics and Ground System Design
3. Wind Weighting System Development

== History ==
The team was established in 1995 by a group of model rocket hobbyists interested in spaceflight. The team is supported by corporate sponsorship.

=== D.R. Hero ===
The D.R. Hero rocket was launched in August 1995. It was dedicated to stuntman Dar Robinson, a late friend of Ky Michaelson. The rocket was 18 feet (5 m) tall and 6 inches (152 mm) in diameter. It was anticipated to reach 100,000 feet (30,000 m). This rocket failed in a large CATO (catastrophe at take off) motor failure just above the ground.

=== Joe Boxer launches ===
Launched on August 18, 1996, this rocket was also 18 feet (5 m) tall and 6 inches in diameter. The name is attributed to the largest contributing sponsor, Joe Boxer. It was anticipated to reach 70,000 feet (21,000 m); however, the actual height obtained was only 66,000 feet (20,100 m). The entire rocket was recovered after what was considered a successful flight. All of the rocket's systems functioned as intended and this flight was claimed to be the first amateur rocket to be recovered intact after reaching more than 50,000 feet (15,000 m).

=== Space shots ===
==== 1997 ====
Launched on July 21, 1997, this slightly smaller rocket was 17 feet (5 m) tall and 6 inches in diameter, with an upper stage dart, which was only 3 or 4 inches across. It was the first two-stage rocket launched by CSXT and was expected to reach 400,000 feet (120,000 m). During the launch, an electronics failure prevented the ignition of the second stage, though the first stage successfully detached and was recovered with a parachute.

==== 2000 ====
This rocket was launched on September 29, 2000, and was 15 feet (5 m) tall and 8.625 inches in diameter. It was expected to reach 60 nautical miles (110 km) with a maximum speed of 3,205 mph (5,158 km/h). After launch, the rocket encountered problems at 45,000 feet (13,700 m), where the wind sheared off the fin, causing the rocket to break apart. Although the launch was fairly unsuccessful, it did set a record for amateur rocket speed of 3,205 mph (5,158 km/h).

==== 2002 ====
This rocket was launched on September 19, 2002. It was launched at the Black Rock Desert in Nevada. The rocket was equipped with a solid propellant motor. The motor was to accelerate the rocket to Mach 5. The rocket was equipped with GPS receivers and antennas, video recording devices, and a series of flight monitoring devices. Three seconds after the rocket launched the motor burned through the casing, causing the rocket to fail.

==== 2004 "GoFast" ====
Timeline of SpaceShipOne, SpaceShipTwo, CSXT and New Shepard sub-orbital flights. Where booster and capsule achieved different altitudes, the higher is plotted. In the SVG file, hover over a point to show details.

The rocket was launched on Monday, May 17, 2004. This rocket was the first amateur rocket to exceed 100 kilometres (62 mi), the official boundary of outer space. It was launched at the Black Rock Desert. The rocket reached top speed of 3,420 mph (5,500 km/h; 1,530 m/s) in 10 seconds, and reached an estimated altitude of 72 miles (116 km). The avionics were recovered by deployment of a parachute. The final verified altitude of the rocket was released as 72 miles (116 km).

The rocket was 21 feet (6.4 m) tall and 10 inches (25 cm) in diameter, and used an ammonium perchlorate-based solid propellant.

==== 2014 "GoFast" ====
On July 14, 2014, the team repeated their accomplishment with a second successful space launch. Analysis of the data from the recovered military-grade Inertial Measurement Unit (IMU) that flew onboard shows that the GoFast rocket reached an altitude of 385,800 feet (73.07 mi; 117.6 km) above mean sea level and hit a top speed of 3,580 mph (5,800 km/h; 1,600 m/s).

== See also ==
- Amateur rocketry
- Private spaceflight
- Copenhagen Suborbitals
- Sounding Rocket
