= Tripoli Rocketry Association =

U.S. model rocketry association

Tripoli Rocketry Association, Inc.
- Type: non-profit organization
- Industry: High Power Amateur Rocketry
- Predecessors: Tripoli Rocket Club
- Founded: April 13, 1985, Cincinnati, Ohio, U.S.
- Website: www.tripoli.org

The Tripoli Rocketry Association (TRA) is an international organization and one of the two major organizing bodies for high power amateur rocketry in the United States.

== History ==
Tripoli Rocketry Association was founded in 1964 in the Pittsburgh, Pennsylvania, region as a high school science club, integrating both model rocketry and space science. The name "Tripoli" was chosen because the founding members came from three towns, and one of them helped fund the club's early projects using gold coins that his father had brought back from Tripoli (whose name approximately means "three towns") Lebanon after World War II. By the late-1980s, it transitioned from a regional club into formal, incorporated, national organization, with a focus on self-regulating advanced, High-Power Rocketry (HPR). The deregulation of the aviation industry by the Reagan Administration also facilitated the growth of HPR activities.

The founder was Francis G. Graham. Early members who helped expand the club were Curtis W. Hughes, Kenneth J. Good, and Arthur R. Bower, with Thomas J. (Tom) Blazanin leading its formalization as an incorporated national organization in 1987 with the assistance of Alaska lawyer Darrel J. Gardner.

Tripoli organizes many rocket launches, both regional events hosted by local prefectures and larger international launches like LDRS ("Large Dangerous Rocket Ships") and BALLS. They also provide insurance for organized launches, administer a member certification program for flying high power rockets, and perform testing and certification of commercial hobby rocket motors.

Tripoli has expanded internationally over the years, and currently has clubs in many countries including Argentina, Australia, Canada, Colombia, Costa Rica, France, Germany, Ireland, Italy, Mexico, Netherlands, Spain, Sweden, Switzerland, the United Kingdom, and the United States. Additionally, it formerly was active in Israel.

Tripoli was involved as a plaintiff in a nine-year lawsuit (in conjunction with the National Association of Rocketry as a co-plaintiff) against the Bureau of Alcohol, Tobacco, Firearms and Explosives (ATF) as the defendant, regarding its claims of jurisdiction over and legal classifications regarding permitting, storage, and use of ammonium perchlorate composite propellant (APCP) in rocket motors. On March 16, 2009, the United States district court for the District of Columbia found in favor of TRA/NAR, and ordered the ATF to vacate APCP from its list of regulated explosives.
