= New Zealand Rocketry Association =

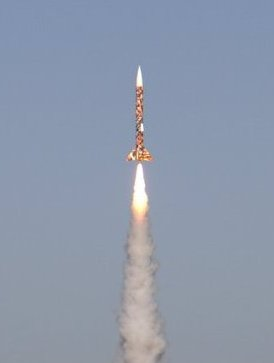
A high-power rocket lifts off at Taupiri

The New Zealand Rocketry Association is a model rocketry organisation based in Auckland, New Zealand. The NZRA holds launches and meetings bi-monthly at its Taupiri launch site, an hour south of Auckland, and has an annual launch day. Launch clearance from the Civil Aviation Authority is required for all launches, to ensure there are no aircraft flying through the area.

On 19 April 2025, a team of NZRA members led by Ethan Kosoof launched Meraki II from Mt. White Station, near Arthur's Pass. The two-stage (O7800 to N3100) rocket travelled up to Mach 5.6 and reached 121.6 km (75.6 mi), thereby crossing the Kármán line — making it the first non-American amateur rocket to reach space.

== Altitude records ==
The NZRA holds altitude records within New Zealand for each class of rocket motor, from A-N (except for M), for both single stage and multistage/cluster rockets. Every record, as of October 2023, is listed below:

Single Stage NZRA Altitude Records
Motor Class	Motor:	Name(s) of Holder(s):	Date:	Altitude:
A	A8-3	Tom, Antoni & Emilia Mackenzie	14 June 2020	279 m (915 ft)
B	B6-6	Tom, Antoni & Emilia Mackenzie	6 February 2021	269 m (883 ft)
C	C12-6	Oliver Bergquist	19 December 2021	272 m (892 ft)
D	D24-T	Jack Davies	1 December 2013	646 m (2,119 ft)
E	E12	Jack Davies	31 May 2014	795 m (2,608 ft)
F	F24W	Jack Davies	9 March 2014	1,008 m (3,307 ft)
G	G80T	Ian Parker & Dave Stephens	7 May 2022	1,742 m (5,715 ft)
H	H268R	Jim Hefkey	6 May 2012	2,512 m (8,241 ft)
I	I391SN	Kelvin McVinnie	9 January 2022	2,739 m (8,986 ft)
J	J510	Joel Schiff	3 May 2014	5,600 m (18,400 ft)
K	K480	Joel Schiff & Martin Aspell	7 April 2013	6,135 m (20,128 ft)
L	L546	Kim McVinnie	9 February 2020	4,666 m (15,308 ft)
M	M977SM	Kim McVinnie	4 May 2024	6,618 m (21,715 ft)
N	N1000W	Joel Schiff & Martin Aspell	20 February 2011	10,275 m (33,711 ft)

Multistage/Cluster NZRA Altitude Records
Motor Class:	Motors:	Name(s) of Holder(s):	Date:	Altitude:
E	3x D18-6	Dean & Grayson Spittle	10 January 2021	301 m (988 ft)
I	I200W, G64W	Jack Davies	3 May 2014	574 m (1,883 ft)
N	M1939W, 2x J800T, 2x K700W	Craig Packard	20 February 2011	3,173 m (10,410 ft)
O	N2000W, 4x K700W	Craig Packard	5 February 2012	3,958 m (12,986 ft)

Currently highest altitude record within New Zealand was set by Martin Aspell and Joel Schiff, of 10,275 m (33,711 ft), on 20 February 2011, with a N1000W motor. The previous highest record was set by Phil Vukovich, of 8,378 m (27,487 ft), on 6 September 2008.
