= Anti-ballistic weapon =

Weapon intended to counter ballistic objects

An anti-ballistic weapon is any weapon (be it a missile, a laser, or another type of object) designed to counter threats which are ballistic objects.

"Ballistic objects" include:

- Artillery rockets
- Artillery shells
- Ballistic missiles
- Mortar bombs
- Rocket-propelled mortar bombs

== Current Tactical Systems ==
=== Israel ===
- Iron Dome

== See also ==
- Anti-ballistic missile
