= Line of sight =

Unobstructed line between an observer and a subject of interest

The line of sight, also known as visual axis or sightline (also sight line), is an imaginary line between a viewer/observer/spectator's eye(s) and a subject of interest, or their relative direction. The subject may be any definable object taken note of or to be taken note of by the observer, at any distance more than least distance of distinct vision. In optics, refraction of a ray due to use of lenses can cause distortion. Shadows, patterns and movement can also influence line of sight interpretation (as in optical illusions).

The term "line" typically presumes that the light by which the observed object is seen travels as a straight ray, which is sometimes not the case as light can take a curved/angulated path when reflected from a mirror, refracted by a lens or density changes in the traversed media, or deflected by a gravitational field. Fields of study feature specific targets, such as vessels in navigation, marker flags or natural features in surveying, celestial objects in astronomy, and so on. To have optimal observational outcome, it is preferable to have a completely unobstructed sightline.

== Applications ==
- Sightline (architecture)
- Line-of-sight fire, shooting directly at a visible target on a relatively flat trajectory. The target is in the line of sight of the sighting device and the rifleman's rule applies.
- Line-of-sight range
- Line-of-sight (missile), the straight line between the missile and the target
- Radar horizon
- Line-of-sight propagation, electro-magnetic waves travelling in a straight line
  - Non-line-of-sight propagation
- Line-of-sight velocity, an object's speed straight towards or away from an observer
- Line-of-sight double star, one in which two stars are only coincidentally close together as seen from Earth
- Beyond visual line of sight
