= James Ingalls =

James Ingalls may refer to:

- James Monroe Ingalls (1837–1927), American soldier and authority on ballistics
- James F. Ingalls, theatre lighting designer
