= Very-low-drag bullet =

Type of bullet

A traditional hollow point boat tail very-low-drag rifle bullet. The jackets of these bullets are generally made out of a copper alloy (such as gilding metal or cupronickel)

A very-low-drag bullet (VLD) is primarily a small arms ballistics development of the 1980s–1990s, driven by the design objective of bullets with higher degrees of accuracy and kinetic efficiency, especially at extended ranges. To achieve this, the projectile must minimize air resistance in flight. Usage has been greatest from military snipers and long-range target shooters, including F-class and benchrest competitors, but hunters have also benefited. Most VLD bullets are used in rifles. VLD bullets typically have a G1 ballistic coefficient greater than 0.5, although the threshold is undefined.

Bullets with a lower drag coefficient decelerate less rapidly. A low drag coefficient flattens the projectile's trajectory and also markedly decreases the lateral drift caused by crosswinds. The higher velocity of bullets with low drag coefficients means they retain more kinetic energy.

== Development ==
VLD bullets are long and heavy for their diameter, to achieve a high sectional density. Development of VLD bullets has focused on reducing a form factor defined as the sectional density divided by the ballistic coefficient. Form factor can be minimized by:

- bullet nose design incorporating a secant ogive, tangent ogive, Von Kármán ogive or Sears-Haack profile
- the use of tapered bullet heels, also known as boat-tails
- a cavity or hollow in the bullet nose (hollow point) will reduce weight (which increases both the impact of drag and the initial velocity) while shifting the projectile's centre of gravity rearward to improve stability with concentric and coincident centre of pressure and centre of mass by compensating for the use of a boat-tail.

The resulting projectile should be streamlined for easier passage through the air. Consistency in bullet production, allied to consistency in the assembly of cartridges (quality control) should give excellent shot-to-shot consistency.

The principles of bullet design and flight are classically set out in Franklin Ware Mann's The Bullet's Flight From Powder to Target: Ballistics of Small Arms.

== Mono-metal designs ==
Machining mono-metal bullets (coreless bullets made of one single metal) offers bullet designers the freedom to design slender, aerodynamically efficient shapes that cannot be produced with more traditional bullet production methods. Professional quality control during and after production is needed to guarantee the bullets' consistency and accuracy. Mono-metal solid bullets are more expensive than traditional jacketed hollow point boat-tail VLD bullets.

To reduce damage to the employed barrel and increase muzzle velocity, some modern mono-metal VLD bullets are bore-riding bullets, in which thin driving bands are the only parts that are etched by a barrel's lands. The use of driving bands originates from artillery shells and to use these driving bands correctly requires projectiles and barrels to be precision-fitted to each other.

Mono-metal VLD bullets are normally machined from solid bars of highly-machinable metals or alloys using CNC lathes. Common materials include UNS C36000 free-cutting brass, lead-free brass, oxygen-free copper and other highly machinable alloys of copper, nickel, and tellurium.

== See also ==
- Glossary of firearms terms
- Aerodynamic drag
- Boundary layer
- Nose cone design
- Parasitic drag
