= External ballistics =

Behavior of projectiles in flight

This schlieren image of a bullet travelling in free-flight demonstrates the air-pressure dynamics surrounding the bullet.

External ballistics or exterior ballistics is the part of ballistics that deals with the behavior of a projectile in flight. It deals with projectiles under the influence of a gravitational field; it includes those powered and un-powered, guided and unguided, spin and fin stabilized, and flying through an atmosphere and in the vacuum of space.

Gun-launched projectiles may be unpowered, deriving all their velocity from the propellant's ignition until the projectile exits the gun barrel. However, exterior ballistics analysis also deals with the trajectories of rocket-assisted gun-launched projectiles and gun-launched rockets and rockets that acquire all their trajectory velocity from the interior ballistics of their on-board propulsion system, either a rocket motor or air-breathing engine, both during their boost phase and after motor burnout. External ballistics is also concerned with the free-flight of other projectiles, such as balls, arrows etc.

== Forces ==
When in flight, the main or major forces acting on the projectile are gravity, drag, and if present, wind; if in powered flight, thrust; and if guided, the forces imparted by the control surfaces.

In small arms external ballistics applications, gravity imparts a downward acceleration on the projectile, causing it to drop from the line-of-sight. Drag, or the air resistance, decelerates the projectile with a force proportional to the square of the velocity. Wind makes the projectile deviate from its trajectory. During flight, gravity, drag, and wind have a major impact on the path of the projectile, and must be accounted for when predicting how the projectile will travel.

For medium to longer ranges and flight times, besides gravity, air resistance and wind, several intermediate or meso variables described in the external factors paragraph have to be taken into account for small arms. Meso variables can become significant for firearms users that have to deal with angled shot scenarios or extended ranges, but are seldom relevant at common hunting and target shooting distances.

For long to very long small arms target ranges and flight times, minor effects and forces such as the ones described in the long range factors paragraph become important and have to be taken into account. The practical effects of these minor variables are generally irrelevant for most firearms users, since normal group scatter at short and medium ranges prevails over the influence these effects exert on projectile trajectories.

At extremely long ranges, artillery must fire projectiles along trajectories that are not even approximately straight; they are closer to parabolic, although air resistance affects this. Extreme long range projectiles are subject to significant deflections, depending on circumstances, from the line toward the target; and all external factors and long range factors must be taken into account when aiming. In very large-calibre artillery cases, like the Paris Gun, very subtle effects that are not covered in this article can further refine aiming solutions.

In the case of ballistic missiles, the altitudes involved have a significant effect as well, with part of the flight taking place in a near-vacuum well above a rotating Earth, steadily moving the target from where it was at launch time.

=== Stabilizing non-spherical projectiles during flight ===
Two methods can be employed to stabilize non-spherical projectiles during flight:

- Projectiles like arrows or arrow like sabots such as the M829 Armor-Piercing, Fin-Stabilized, Discarding Sabot (APFSDS) achieve stability by forcing their center of pressure (CP) behind their center of mass (CM) with tail surfaces. The CP behind the CM condition yields stable projectile flight, meaning the projectile will not overturn during flight through the atmosphere due to aerodynamic forces.
- Projectiles like small arms bullets and artillery shells must deal with their CP being in front of their CM, which destabilizes these projectiles during flight. To stabilize such projectiles the projectile is spun around its longitudinal (leading to trailing) axis. The spinning mass creates gyroscopic forces that keep the bullet's length axis resistant to the destabilizing overturning torque of the CP being in front of the CM.

== Main effects ==
=== Projectile/bullet drop, and path ===
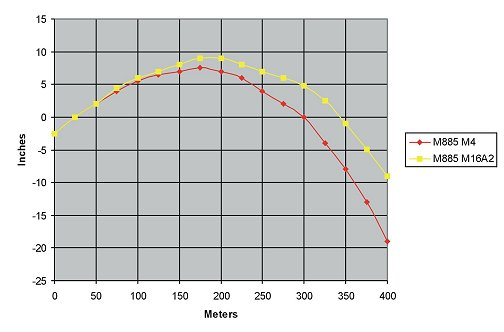
Typical trajectory graph for a M4 carbine and M16A2 rifle using identical M855 cartridges with identical projectiles. Though both trajectories have an identical 25 m near zero, the difference in muzzle velocity of the projectiles gradually causes a significant difference in trajectory and far zero. The 0 inch axis represents the line of sight or horizontal sighting plane.

The effect of gravity on a projectile in flight is often referred to as projectile drop or bullet drop. It is important to understand the effect of gravity when zeroing the sighting components of a gun. To plan for projectile drop and compensate properly, one must understand parabolically shaped trajectories.

==== Drop ====
In order for a projectile to impact any distant target, the barrel must be inclined to a positive elevation angle relative to the target. This is due to the fact that the projectile will begin to respond to the effects of gravity the instant it is free from the mechanical constraints of the bore. The imaginary line down the center axis of the bore and out to infinity is called the line of departure and is the line on which the projectile leaves the barrel.

Due to the effects of gravity a projectile can never impact a target higher than the line of departure. When a positively inclined projectile travels downrange, it arcs below the line of departure as it is being deflected off its initial path by gravity. Projectile/Bullet drop is defined as the vertical distance of the projectile below the line of departure from the bore. Even when the line of departure is tilted upward or downward, projectile drop is still defined as the distance between the bullet and the line of departure at any point along the trajectory. Projectile drop does not describe the actual trajectory of the projectile. Knowledge of projectile drop however is useful when conducting a direct comparison of two different projectiles regarding the shape of their trajectories, comparing the effects of variables such as velocity and drag behavior.

==== Path ====
For hitting a distant target an appropriate positive elevation angle is required that is achieved by angling the line of sight from the shooter's eye through the centerline of the sighting system downward toward the line of departure. This can be accomplished by simply adjusting the sights down mechanically, or by securing the entire sighting system to a sloped mounting having a known downward slope, or by a combination of both. This procedure has the effect of elevating the muzzle when the barrel must be subsequently raised to align the sights with the target. A projectile leaving a muzzle at a given elevation angle follows a ballistic trajectory whose characteristics are dependent upon various factors such as muzzle velocity, gravity, and aerodynamic drag. This ballistic trajectory is referred to as the bullet path. If the projectile is spin stabilized, aerodynamic forces will also predictably arc the trajectory slightly to the right, if the rifling employs "right-hand twist." Some barrels are cut with left-hand twist, and the bullet will arc to the left, as a result. Therefore, to compensate for this path deviation, the sights also have to be adjusted left or right, respectively. A constant wind also predictably affects the bullet path, pushing it slightly left or right, and a little bit more up and down, depending on the wind direction. The magnitude of these deviations are also affected by whether the bullet is on the upward or downward slope of the trajectory, due to a phenomenon called "yaw of repose," where a spinning bullet tends to steadily and predictably align slightly off center from its point mass trajectory. Nevertheless, each of these trajectory perturbations are predictable once the projectile aerodynamic coefficients are established, through a combination of detailed analytical modeling and test range measurements.

Projectile/bullet path analysis is of great use to shooters because it allows them to establish ballistic tables that will predict how much vertical elevation and horizontal deflection corrections must be applied to the sight line for shots at various known distances. The most detailed ballistic tables are developed for long range artillery and are based on six-degree-of-freedom trajectory analysis, which accounts for aerodynamic behavior along the three axial directions—elevation, range, and deflection—and the three rotational directions—pitch, yaw, and spin. For small arms applications, trajectory modeling can often be simplified to calculations involving only four of these degrees-of-freedom, lumping the effects of pitch, yaw and spin into the effect of a yaw-of-repose to account for trajectory deflection. Once detailed range tables are established, shooters can relatively quickly adjust sights based on the range to target, wind, air temperature and humidity, and other geometric considerations, such as terrain elevation differences.

Projectile path values are determined by both the sight height, or the distance of the line of sight above the bore centerline, and the range at which the sights are zeroed, which in turn determines the elevation angle. A projectile following a ballistic trajectory has both forward and vertical motion. Forward motion is slowed due to air resistance, and in point mass modeling the vertical motion is dependent on a combination of the elevation angle and gravity. Initially, the projectile is rising with respect to the line of sight or the horizontal sighting plane. The projectile eventually reaches its apex (highest point in the trajectory parabola) where the vertical speed component decays to zero under the effect of gravity, and then begins to descend, eventually impacting the earth. The farther the distance to the intended target, the greater the elevation angle and the higher the apex.

The projectile path crosses the horizontal sighting plane two times. The point closest to the gun occurs while the bullet is climbing through the line of sight and is called the near zero. The second point occurs as the projectile is descending through the line of sight. It is called the far zero and defines the current sight in distance for the gun. Projectile path is described numerically as distances above or below the horizontal sighting plane at various points along the trajectory. This is in contrast to projectile drop which is referenced to the plane containing the line of departure regardless of the elevation angle. Since each of these two parameters uses a different reference datum, significant confusion can result because even though a projectile is tracking well below the line of departure it can still be gaining actual and significant height with respect to the line of sight as well as the surface of the Earth in the case of a horizontal or near horizontal shot taken over flat terrain.

==== Maximum point-blank range and battle zero ====
Knowledge of the projectile drop and path has some practical uses to shooters even if it does not describe the actual trajectory of the projectile. For example, if the vertical projectile position over a certain range reach is within the vertical height of the target area the shooter wants to hit, the point of aim does not necessarily need to be adjusted over that range; the projectile is considered to have a sufficiently flat point-blank range trajectory for that particular target. Also known as "battle zero", maximum point-blank range is also of importance to the military. Soldiers are instructed to fire at any target within this range by simply placing their weapon's sights on the center of mass of the enemy target. Any errors in range estimation are tactically irrelevant, as a well-aimed shot will hit the torso of the enemy soldier. The current trend for elevated sights and higher-velocity cartridges in assault rifles is in part due to a desire to extend the maximum point-blank range, which makes the rifle easier to use.

=== Drag resistance ===
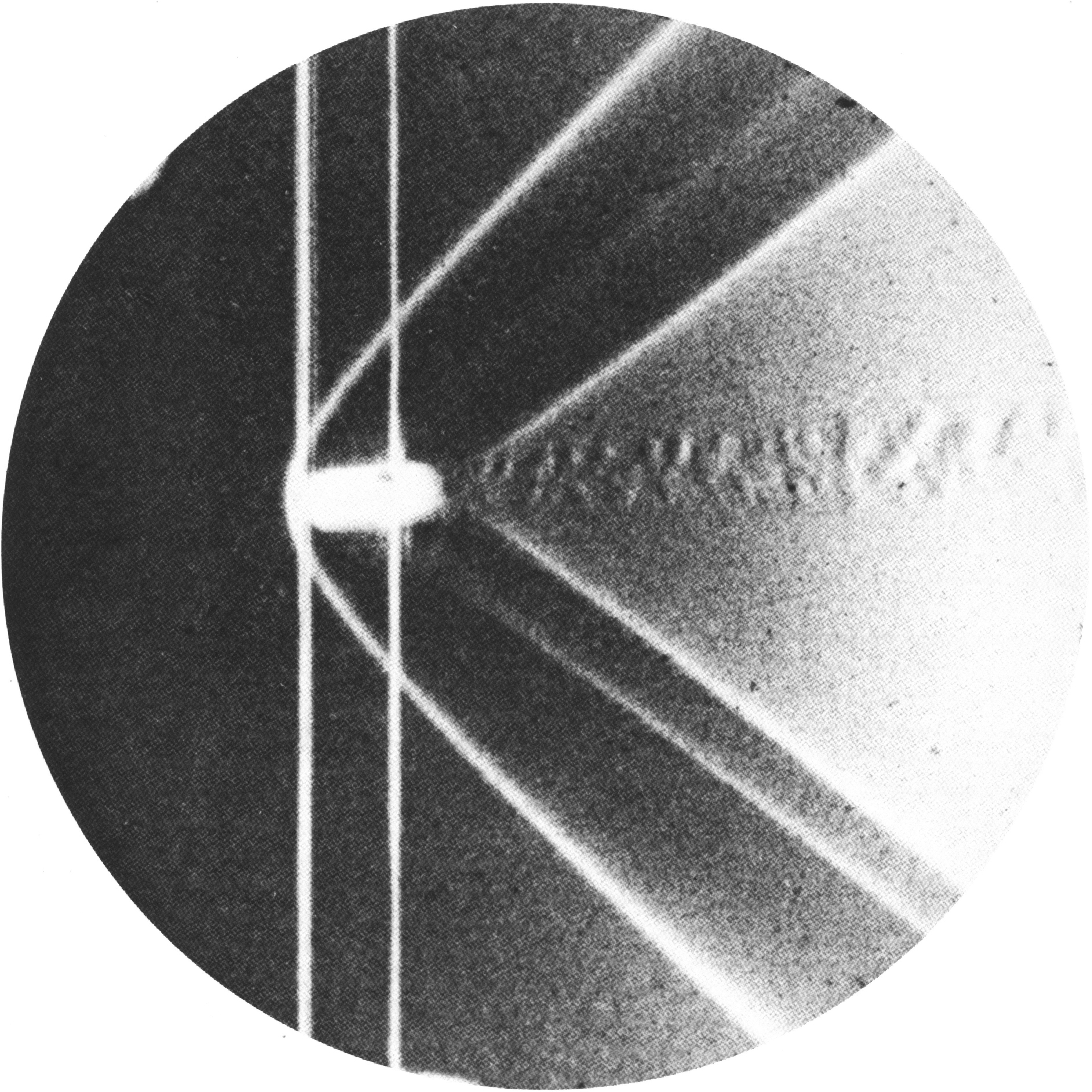
Schlieren photo/Shadowgraph of the detached shock or bow shockwave around a bullet in supersonic flight, published by Ernst Mach in 1888

Mathematical models, such as computational fluid dynamics, are used for calculating the effects of drag or air resistance; they are quite complex and not yet completely reliable, but research is ongoing. The most reliable method, therefore, of establishing the necessary projectile aerodynamic properties to properly describe flight trajectories is by empirical measurement.

=== Fixed drag curve models generated for standard-shaped projectiles ===
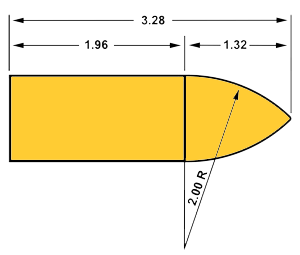
G1 shape standard projectile. All measurements in calibers/diameters.

Use of ballistics tables or ballistics software based on the Mayevski/Siacci method and G1 drag model, introduced in 1881, are the most common method used to work with external ballistics. Projectiles are described by a ballistic coefficient, or BC, which combines the air resistance of the bullet shape (the drag coefficient) and its sectional density (a function of mass and bullet diameter).

The deceleration due to drag that a projectile with mass m, velocity v, and diameter d will experience is proportional to 1/BC, 1/m, v² and d². The BC gives the ratio of ballistic efficiency compared to the standard G1 projectile, which is a fictitious projectile with a flat base, a length of 3.28 calibers/diameters, and a 2 calibers/diameters radius tangential curve for the point. The G1 standard projectile originates from the "C" standard reference projectile defined by the German steel, ammunition and armaments manufacturer Krupp in 1881. The G1 model standard projectile has a BC of 1. The French Gâvre Commission decided to use this projectile as their first reference projectile, giving the G1 name.

Sporting bullets, with a calibre d ranging from 0.177 to 0.50 inches (4.50 to 12.7 mm), have G1 BC's in the range 0.12 to slightly over 1.00, with 1.00 being the most aerodynamic, and 0.12 being the least. Very-low-drag bullets with BC's ≥ 1.10 can be designed and produced on CNC precision lathes out of mono-metal rods, but they often have to be fired from custom made full bore rifles with special barrels.

Sectional density is a very important aspect of a projectile or bullet, and is for a round projectile like a bullet the ratio of frontal surface area (half the bullet diameter squared, times pi) to bullet mass. Since, for a given bullet shape, frontal surface increases as the square of the calibre, and mass increases as the cube of the diameter, then sectional density grows linearly with bore diameter. Since BC combines shape and sectional density, a half scale model of the G1 projectile will have a BC of 0.5, and a quarter scale model will have a BC of 0.25.

Since different projectile shapes will respond differently to changes in velocity (particularly between supersonic and subsonic velocities), a BC provided by a bullet manufacturer will be an average BC that represents the common range of velocities for that bullet. For rifle bullets, this will probably be a supersonic velocity, for pistol bullets it will probably be subsonic. For projectiles that travel through the supersonic, transonic and subsonic flight regimes BC is not well approximated by a single constant, but is considered to be a function BC(M) of the Mach number M; here M equals the projectile velocity divided by the speed of sound. During the flight of the projectile the M will decrease, and therefore (in most cases) the BC will also decrease.

Most ballistic tables or software takes for granted that one specific drag function correctly describes the drag and hence the flight characteristics of a bullet related to its ballistics coefficient. Those models do not differentiate between wadcutter, flat-based, spitzer, boat-tail, very-low-drag, etc. bullet types or shapes. They assume one invariable drag function as indicated by the published BC.

Several drag curve models optimized for several standard projectile shapes are however available. The resulting fixed drag curve models for several standard projectile shapes or types are referred to as the:

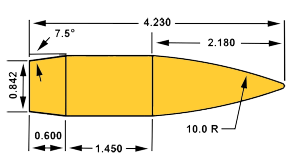
G7 shape standard projectile. All measurements in calibers/diameters.

- G1 or Ingalls (flatbase with 2 caliber (blunt) nose ogive - by far the most popular)
- G2 (Aberdeen J projectile)
- G5 (short 7.5° boat-tail, 6.19 calibers long tangent ogive)
- G6 (flatbase, 6 calibers long secant ogive)
- G7 (long 7.5° boat-tail, 10 calibers tangent ogive, preferred by some manufacturers for very-low-drag bullets)
- G8 (flatbase, 10 calibers long secant ogive)
- GL (blunt lead nose)

How different speed regimes affect .338 calibre rifle bullets can be seen in the .338 Lapua Magnum product brochure which states Doppler radar established G1 BC data. The reason for publishing data like in this brochure is that the Siacci/Mayevski G1 model can not be tuned for the drag behavior of a specific projectile whose shape significantly deviates from the used reference projectile shape. Some ballistic software designers, who based their programs on the Siacci/Mayevski G1 model, give the user the possibility to enter several different G1 BC constants for different speed regimes to calculate ballistic predictions that closer match a bullets flight behavior at longer ranges compared to calculations that use only one BC constant.

The above example illustrates the central problem fixed drag curve models have. These models will only yield satisfactory accurate predictions as long as the projectile of interest has the same shape as the reference projectile or a shape that closely resembles the reference projectile. Any deviation from the reference projectile shape will result in less accurate predictions. How much a projectile deviates from the applied reference projectile is mathematically expressed by the form factor (i). The form factor can be used to compare the drag experienced by a projectile of interest to the drag experienced by the employed reference projectile at a given velocity (range). The problem that the actual drag curve of a projectile can significantly deviate from the fixed drag curve of any employed reference projectile systematically limits the traditional drag resistance modeling approach. The relative simplicity however makes that it can be explained to and understood by the general shooting public and hence is also popular amongst ballistic software prediction developers and bullet manufacturers that want to market their products.

=== More advanced drag models ===
==== Manges model ====
Although not as well known as the Pejsa model, an additional alternative ballistic model was presented in 1989 by Colonel Duff Manges in 1989. Originally conceived to model projectile drag for 120 mm tank gun ammunition, the novel drag coefficient formula has been applied subsequently to ballistic trajectories of center-fired rifle ammunition with results comparable to those claimed for the Pejsa model.

The Manges model uses a first principles theoretical approach that eschews "G" curves and "ballistic coefficients" based on the standard G1 and other similarity curves. The theoretical description has three main parts. The first is to develop and solve a formulation of the two dimensional differential equations of motion governing flat trajectories of point mass projectiles by defining mathematically a set of quadratures that permit closed form solutions for the trajectory differential equations of motion. A sequence of successive approximation drag coefficient functions is generated that converge rapidly to actual observed drag data. The vacuum trajectory, simplified aerodynamic, d'Antonio, and Euler drag law models are special cases. The Manges drag law thereby provides a unifying influence with respect to earlier models used to obtain two dimensional closed form solutions to the point-mass equations of motion. The third purpose of this paper is to describe a least squares fitting procedure for obtaining the new drag functions from observed experimental data. The author claims that results show excellent agreement with six degree of freedom numerical calculations for modern tank ammunition and available published firing tables for center-fired rifle ammunition having a wide variety of shapes and sizes.

A Microsoft Excel application has been authored that uses least squares fits of wind tunnel acquired tabular drag coefficients. Alternatively, manufacturer supplied ballistic trajectory data, or Doppler acquired velocity data can be fitted as well to calibrate the model. The Excel application then employs custom macroinstructions to calculate the trajectory variables of interest. A modified 4th order Runge–Kutta integration algorithm is used. Like Pejsa, Colonel Manges claims center-fired rifle accuracies to the nearest one tenth of an inch for bullet position, and nearest foot per second for the projectile velocity.

==== Six degrees of freedom model ====
There are also advanced professional ballistic models like PRODAS available. These are based on six degrees of freedom (6 DoF) calculations. 6 DoF modeling accounts for x, y, and z velocities in space along with the projectiles pitch, yaw, and roll rates. 6 DoF modeling needs such elaborate data input, knowledge of the employed projectiles and expensive data collection and verification methods that it is impractical for non-professional ballisticians, but not impossible for the curious, computer literate, and mathematically inclined. Semi-empirical aeroprediction models have been developed that reduced extensive test range data on a wide variety of projectile shapes, normalizing dimensional input geometries to calibers; accounting for nose length and radius, body length, and boattail size, and allowing the full set of 6-dof aerodynamic coefficients to be estimated. Early research on spin-stabilized aeroprediction software resulted in the SPINNER computer program. The FINNER aeroprediction code calculates 6-dof inputs for fin stabilized projectiles. Solids modeling software that determines the projectile parameters of mass, center of gravity, axial and transverse moments of inertia necessary for stability analysis are also readily available, and simple to computer program. Finally, algorithms for 6-dof numerical integration suitable to a 4th order Runge-Kutta are readily available.

Though 6 DoF modeling and software applications have been used by professional, well-equipped organizations for decades, the computing power restrictions of mobile computing devices, like (ruggedized) personal digital assistants, tablet computers, or smartphones impaired field use as calculations generally have to be done on the fly. In 2016 the Scandinavian ammunition manufacturer Nammo Lapua Oy released a 6 DoF calculation model based ballistic free software named Lapua Ballistics (after Lapua Cartridge Factory). The software is distributed as a mobile app only and available for Android and iOS devices. The employed 6 DoF model is, however, limited to Lapua bullets, as a 6 DoF solver needs bullet-specific drag coefficient (Cd)/Doppler radar data and geometric dimensions of the projectile(s) of interest. For other bullets, the Lapua Ballistics solver is limited to and based on G1 or G7 ballistic coefficients and the Mayevski/Siacci method.

==== Artillery software suites ====
Military organizations have developed ballistic models like the NATO Armament Ballistic Kernel (NABK) for fire-control systems for artillery like the SG2 Shareable (Fire Control) Software Suite (S4) from the NATO Army Armaments Group (NAAG). The NATO Armament Ballistic Kernel is a 4-DoF modified point mass model. This is a compromise between a simple point mass model and a computationally intensive 6-DoF model. A six- and seven-degree-of-freedom standard called BALCO has also been developed within NATO working groups. BALCO is a trajectory simulation program based on the mathematical model defined by the NATO Standardization Recommendation 4618. The primary goal of BALCO is to compute high-fidelity trajectories for both conventional axisymmetric and precision-guided projectiles featuring control surfaces. The BALCO trajectory model is a FORTRAN 2003 program that implements the following features:

- 6/7‐DoF equations of motion
- 7th‐order Runge‐Kutta‐Fehlberg integration
- Earth models
- Atmosphere models
- Aerodynamic models
- Thrust and Base Burn models
- Actuator models The predictions these models yield are subject to comparison study.

=== Doppler radar measurements ===
For the precise establishment of drag or air resistance effects on projectiles, Doppler radar measurements are required. Weibel 1000e or Infinition BR-1001 Doppler radars are used by governments, professional ballisticians, defence forces and a few ammunition manufacturers to obtain real-world data of the flight behavior of projectiles of their interest. Correctly established state of the art Doppler radar measurements can determine the flight behavior of projectiles as small as airgun pellets in three-dimensional space to within a few millimetres accuracy. The gathered data regarding the projectile deceleration can be derived and expressed in several ways, such as ballistic coefficients (BC) or drag coefficients (C_{d}). Because a spinning projectile experiences both precession and nutation about its center of gravity as it flies, further data reduction of doppler radar measurements is required to separate yaw induced drag and lift coefficients from the zero yaw drag coefficient, in order to make measurements fully applicable to 6-dof trajectory analysis.

Doppler radar measurement results for a lathe-turned monolithic solid .50 BMG very-low-drag bullet (Lost River J40 .510-773 grain monolithic solid bullet / twist rate 1:15 in) look like this:

Range (m)	500	600	700	800	900	1000	1100	1200	1300	1400	1500	1600	1700	1800	1900	2000
Ballistic coefficient	1.040	1.051	1.057	1.063	1.064	1.067	1.068	1.068	1.068	1.066	1.064	1.060	1.056	1.050	1.042	1.032

The initial rise in the BC value is attributed to a projectile's always-present yaw and precession out of the bore. The test results were obtained by averaging multiple shots, although the exact quantity is unknown. The bullet was assigned 1.062 for its BC number by the bullet's manufacturer Lost River Ballistic Technologies.

Doppler radar measurement results for a Lapua GB528 Scenar 19.44 g (300 gr) 8.59 mm (0.338 in) calibre very-low-drag bullet look like this:

Mach number	0.000	0.400	0.500	0.600	0.700	0.800	0.825	0.850	0.875	0.900	0.925	0.950	0.975	1.000	1.025	1.050	1.075	1.100	1.150	1.200	1.300	1.400	1.500	1.600	1.800	2.000	2.200	2.400
Drag coefficient	0.230	0.229	0.200	0.171	0.164	0.144	0.141	0.137	0.137	0.142	0.154	0.177	0.236	0.306	0.334	0.341	0.345	0.347	0.348	0.348	0.343	0.336	0.328	0.321	0.304	0.292	0.282	0.270

This tested bullet experiences its maximum drag coefficient when entering the transonic flight regime around Mach 1.200.

View source data.

With the help of Doppler radar measurements projectile specific drag models can be established that are most useful when shooting at extended ranges where the bullet speed slows to the transonic speed region near the speed of sound. This is where the projectile drag predicted by mathematic modeling can significantly depart from the actual drag experienced by the projectile. Further Doppler radar measurements are used to study subtle in-flight effects of various bullet constructions.

Governments, professional ballisticians, defence forces and ammunition manufacturers can supplement Doppler radar measurements with measurements gathered by telemetry probes fitted to larger projectiles.

=== General trends in drag or ballistic coefficient ===
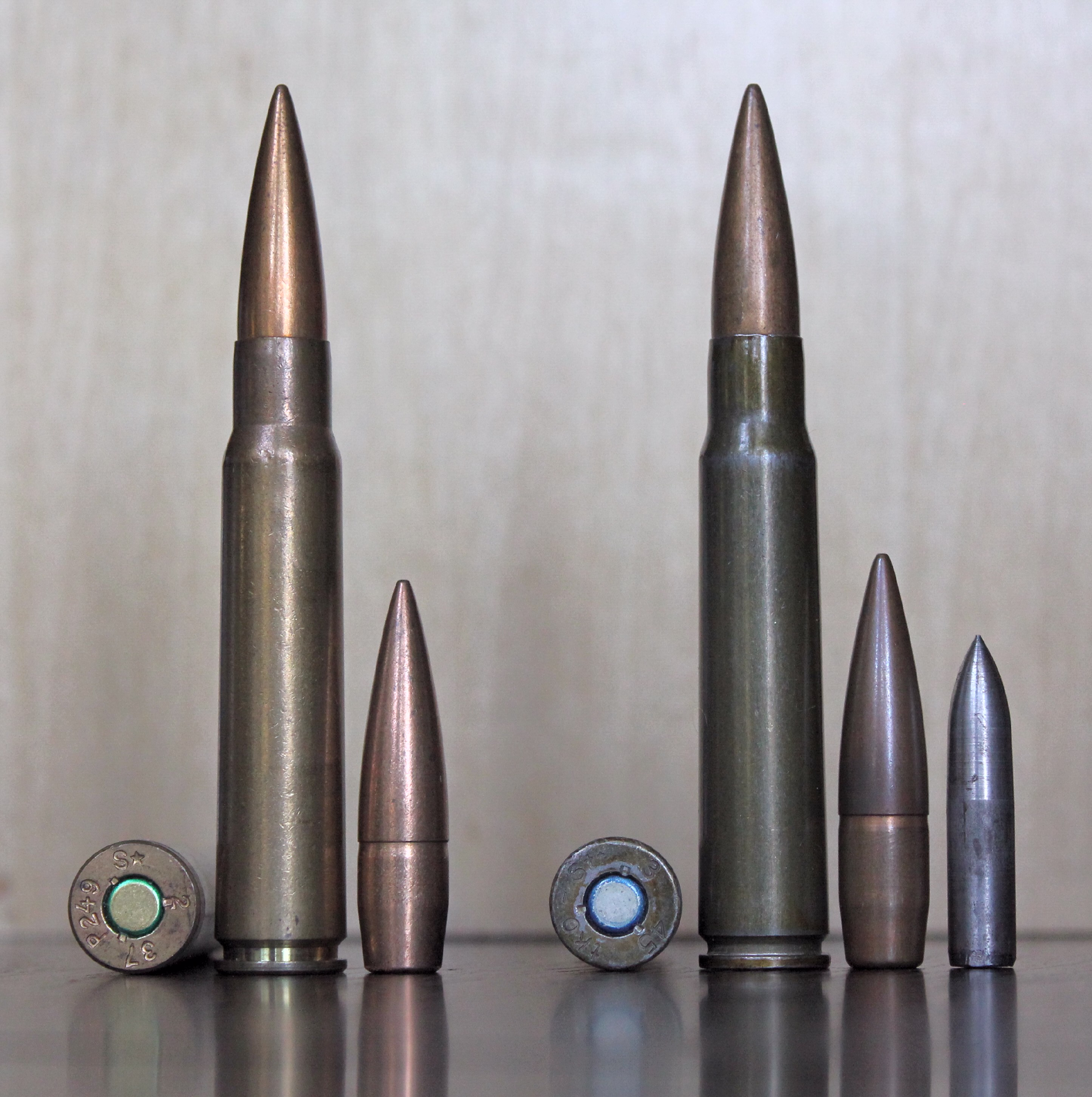
Left German 7.9 mm s.S. (FMJ) and right S.m.E. ammunition beside their boat-tailed projectiles with cannelures

In general, a pointed projectile will have a better drag coefficient (C_{d}) or ballistic coefficient (BC) than a round-nosed bullet, and a round-nosed bullet will have a better C_{d} or BC than a flat bullet. Large radius curves, resulting in a shallower point angle, will produce lower drags, particularly at supersonic velocities. Hollow point bullets behave much like a flat point of the same point diameter. Projectiles designed for supersonic use often have a slightly tapered base at the rear, called a boat tail, which reduces air resistance in flight. The usefulness of a "tapered rear" for long-range firing was well established already by the early 1870s, but technological difficulties prevented their wide adoption before well into 20th century. Cannelures, which are recessed rings around the projectile used to crimp the projectile securely into the case, will cause an increase in drag.

Analytical software was developed by the Ballistics Research Laboratory – later called the Army Research Laboratory – which reduced actual test range data to parametric relationships for projectile drag coefficient prediction. Large caliber artillery also employs drag reduction mechanisms in addition to streamlining geometry. Rocket-assisted projectiles employ a small rocket motor that ignites upon muzzle exit, providing additional thrust to overcome aerodynamic drag. Rocket assist is most effective with subsonic artillery projectiles. For supersonic long range artillery, where base drag dominates, base bleed is employed. Base bleed is a form of gas generator that does not provide significant thrust, but rather fills the low-pressure area behind the projectile with gas, effectively reducing the base drag and the overall projectile drag coefficient.

=== Transonic problem ===
A projectile fired at supersonic muzzle velocity will at some point slow to approach the speed of sound. At the transonic region (about Mach 1.2–0.8) the centre of pressure (CP) of most non-spherical projectiles shifts forward as the projectile decelerates. That CP shift affects the (dynamic) stability of the projectile. If the projectile is not well stabilized, it cannot remain pointing forward through the transonic region (the projectile starts to exhibit an unwanted precession or coning motion called limit cycle yaw that, if not damped out, can eventually end in uncontrollable tumbling along the length axis). However, even if the projectile has sufficient stability (static and dynamic) to be able to fly through the transonic region and stays pointing forward, it is still affected. The erratic and sudden CP shift and (temporary) decrease of dynamic stability can cause significant dispersion (and hence significant accuracy decay), even if the projectile's flight becomes well behaved again when it enters the subsonic region. This makes accurately predicting the ballistic behavior of projectiles in the transonic region very difficult.

Because of this, marksmen normally restrict themselves to engaging targets close enough that the projectile is still supersonic. (Note: Most spin-stabilized projectiles that suffer from lack of dynamic stability have the problem near the speed of sound where the aerodynamic forces and moments exhibit great changes. It is less common (but possible) for bullets to display significant lack of dynamic stability at supersonic velocities. Since dynamic stability is mostly governed by transonic aerodynamics, it is very hard to predict when a projectile will have sufficient dynamic stability (these are the hardest aerodynamic coefficients to calculate accurately at the most difficult speed regime to predict (transonic)). The aerodynamic coefficients that govern dynamic stability: pitching moment, Magnus moment and the sum of the pitch and angle of attack dynamic moment coefficient (a very hard quantity to predict). In the end, there is little that modeling and simulation can do to accurately predict the level of dynamic stability that a bullet will have downrange. If a projectile has a very high or low level of dynamic stability, modeling may get the answer right. However, if a situation is borderline (dynamic stability near 0 or 2) modeling cannot be relied upon to produce the right answer. This is one of those things that have to be field tested and carefully documented.) In 2015, the American ballistician Bryan Litz introduced the "Extended Long Range" concept to define rifle shooting at ranges where supersonic fired (rifle) bullets enter the transonic region. According to Litz, "Extended Long Range starts whenever the bullet slows to its transonic range. As the bullet slows down to approach Mach 1, it starts to encounter transonic effects, which are more complex and difficult to account for, compared to the supersonic range where the bullet is relatively well-behaved."

The ambient air density has a significant effect on dynamic stability during transonic transition. Though the ambient air density is a variable environmental factor, adverse transonic transition effects can be negated better by a projectile traveling through less dense air, than when traveling through denser air. Projectile or bullet length also affects limit cycle yaw. Longer projectiles experience more limit cycle yaw than shorter projectiles of the same diameter. Another feature of projectile design that has been identified as having an effect on the unwanted limit cycle yaw motion is the chamfer at the base of the projectile. At the very base, or heel of a projectile or bullet, there is a 0.25 to 0.50 mm (0.01 to 0.02 in) chamfer, or radius. The presence of this radius causes the projectile to fly with greater limit cycle yaw angles. Rifling can also have a subtle effect on limit cycle yaw. In general faster spinning projectiles experience less limit cycle yaw.

==== Research into guided projectiles ====
To circumvent the transonic problems encountered by spin-stabilized projectiles, projectiles can theoretically be guided during flight. The Sandia National Laboratories announced in January 2012 it has researched and test-fired 4-inch (102 mm) long prototype dart-like, self-guided bullets for small-caliber, smooth-bore firearms that could hit laser-designated targets at distances of more than a mile (about 1,610 meters or 1760 yards). These projectiles are not spin stabilized and the flight path can steered within limits with an electromagnetic actuator 30 times per second. The researchers also claim they have video of the bullet radically pitching as it exits the barrel and pitching less as it flies down range, a disputed phenomenon known to long-range firearms experts as “going to sleep”. Because the bullet's motions settle the longer it is in flight, accuracy improves at longer ranges, Sandia researcher Red Jones said. “Nobody had ever seen that, but we’ve got high-speed video photography that shows that it’s true,” he said. Recent testing indicates it may be approaching or already achieved initial operational capability.

=== Testing the predictive qualities of software ===
Due to the practical inability to know in advance and compensate for all the variables of flight, no software simulation, however advanced, will yield predictions that will always perfectly match real world trajectories. It is, however, possible to obtain predictions that are very close to actual flight behavior.

==== Empirical measurement method ====
Ballistic prediction computer programs intended for (extreme) long ranges can be evaluated by conducting field tests at the supersonic to subsonic transition range (the last 10 to 20% of the supersonic range of the rifle/cartridge/bullet combination). For a typical .338 Lapua Magnum rifle for example, shooting standard 16.2 gram (250 gr) Lapua Scenar GB488 bullets at 905 m/s (2969 ft/s) muzzle velocity, field testing of the software should be done at ≈ 1200-1300 meters (1312-1422 yd) under International Standard Atmosphere sea level conditions (air density ρ = 1.225 kg/m³). To check how well the software predicts the trajectory at shorter to medium range, field tests at 20, 40 and 60% of the supersonic range have to be conducted. At those shorter to medium ranges, transonic problems and hence unbehaved bullet flight should not occur, and the BC is less likely to be transient. Testing the predictive qualities of software at (extreme) long ranges is expensive because it consumes ammunition; the actual muzzle velocity of all shots fired must be measured to be able to make statistically dependable statements. Sample groups of less than 24 shots may not obtain the desired statistically significant confidence interval.

==== Doppler radar measurement method ====
Governments, professional ballisticians, defence forces and a few ammunition manufacturers use Doppler radars and/or telemetry probes fitted to larger projectiles to obtain precise real world data regarding the flight behavior of the specific projectiles of their interest and thereupon compare the gathered real world data against the predictions calculated by ballistic computer programs. The normal shooting or aerodynamics enthusiast, however, has no access to such expensive professional measurement devices. Authorities and projectile manufacturers are generally reluctant to share the results of Doppler radar tests and the test derived drag coefficients (C_{d}) of projectiles with the general public. Around 2020 more affordable but less capable (amateur) Doppler rader equipment to determine free flight drag coefficients became available for the general public.

In January 2009, the Scandinavian ammunition manufacturer Nammo/Lapua published Doppler radar test-derived drag coefficient data for most of their rifle projectiles. In 2015 the US ammunition manufacturer Berger Bullets announced the use of Doppler radar in unison with PRODAS 6 DoF software to generate trajectory solutions. In 2016 US ammunition manufacturer Hornady announced the use of Doppler radar derived drag data in software utilizing a modified point mass model to generate trajectory solutions. With the measurement derived C_{d} data engineers can create algorithms that utilize both known mathematical ballistic models as well as test specific, tabular data in unison. When used by predictive software like QuickTARGET Unlimited, Lapua Edition, Lapua Ballistics or Hornady 4DOF the Doppler radar test-derived drag coefficient data can be used for more accurate external ballistic predictions.

Some of the Lapua-provided drag coefficient data shows drastic increases in the measured drag around or below the Mach 1 flight velocity region. This behavior was observed for most of the measured small calibre bullets, and not so much for the larger calibre bullets. This implies some (mostly smaller calibre) rifle bullets exhibited more limit cycle yaw (coning and/or tumbling) in the transonic/subsonic flight velocity regime. The information regarding unfavourable transonic/subsonic flight behavior for some of the tested projectiles is important. This is a limiting factor for extended range shooting use, because the effects of limit cycle yaw are not easily predictable and potentially catastrophic for the best ballistic prediction models and software.

Presented C_{d} data can not be simply used for every gun-ammunition combination, since it was measured for the barrels, rotational (spin) velocities and ammunition lots the Lapua testers used during their test firings. Variables like differences in rifling (number of grooves, depth, width and other dimensional properties), twist rates and/or muzzle velocities impart different rotational (spin) velocities and rifling marks on projectiles. Changes in such variables and projectile production lot variations can yield different downrange interaction with the air the projectile passes through that can result in (minor) changes in flight behavior. This particular field of external ballistics is currently (2009) not elaborately studied nor well understood.

=== Predictions of various methods ===
The method employed to model and predict external ballistic behavior can yield differing results with increasing range and time of flight. To illustrate this, several external ballistic behavior prediction methods for the Lapua Scenar GB528 19.44 g (300.0 gr) 8.59 mm (0.338 in) caliber very-low-drag rifle bullet with a manufacturer-stated G1 ballistic coefficient (BC) of 0.785 fired at an 830 m/s (2,723 ft/s) muzzle velocity under International Standard Atmosphere sea level conditions (air density ρ = 1.225 kg/m³, Mach 1 = 340.3 m/s, Mach 1.2 = 408.4 m/s) predicted this for the projectile velocity and time of flight from 0 to 3,000 m (0 to 3,281 yd): (Note: G1, G7, and Doppler radar test derived drag coefficients (C_{d}) prediction method predictions calculated with QuickTARGET Unlimited, Lapua Edition. Pejsa predictions calculated with Lex Talus Corporation Pejsa based ballistic software with the slope constant factor set at the 0.5 default value. 6 DoF modeling predictions calculated with Lapua Ballistics 1.0 app for Android.)

Comparison of Drag Resistance Model Output by Range
Range (m)	Velocity (m/s)					Flight Time (s)					Total Drop (m)				
Range (m)	Doppler-derived, Lapua	Lapua 6 DoF	G1	Pejsa	G7	Doppler-derived, Lapua	Lapua 6 DoF	G1	Pejsa	G7	Doppler-derived, Lapua	Lapua 6 DoF	G1	Pejsa	G7
0	830	830	830	830	830	0.0000	0.0000	0.0000	0.0000	0.0000	0.000	0.000	0.000	0.000	0.000
300	711	711	718	712	713	0.3918	0.3919	0.3897	0.3902	0.3912	0.715	0.714	0.710	0.719	0.714
600	604	604	615	603	606	0.8507	0.8511	0.8423	0.8479	0.8487	3.203	3.195	3.157	3.198	3.191
900	507	506	522	504	508	1.3937	1.3949	1.3732	1.3921	1.3901	8.146	8.132	7.971	8.129	8.109
1,200	422	420	440	413	418	2.0435	2.0467	2.0009	2.0501	2.0415	16.571	16.561	16.073	16.580	16.503
1,500	349	347	374	339	339	2.8276	2.8343	2.7427	2.8556	2.8404	30.035	30.060	28.779	30.271	30.039
1,800	311	310	328	297	303	3.7480	3.7575	3.6029	3.8057	3.7850	50.715	50.836	47.810	51.582	51.165
2,100	288	287	299	270	283	4.7522	4.7641	4.5642	4.8682	4.8110	80.529	80.794	75.205	82.873	81.863
2,400	267	266	278	247	265	5.8354	5.8508	5.6086	6.0294	5.9099	121.023	121.498	112.136	126.870	123.639
2,700	247	244	261	227	249	7.0095	7.0332	6.7276	7.2958	7.0838	173.998	174.796	160.739	185.318	178.082
3,000	227	222	248	208	235	8.2909	8.3346	7.9183	8.6769	8.3369	241.735	243.191	222.430	260.968	246.968

Decent prediction models are expected to yield similar results in the supersonic flight regime. The five example models down to 1,200 m (1,312 yd) all predict supersonic Mach 1.2^{+} projectile velocities and total drop differences within a 51 cm (20.1 in) range. In the transonic flight regime at 1,500 m (1,640 yd) the models predict projectile velocities around Mach 1.0 to Mach 1.1 and total drop differences within a much larger 150 cm (59.1 in) range.

The table shows the Doppler radar test derived drag coefficients (C_{d}) prediction method and the 2017 Lapua Ballistics 6 DoF App predictions produce similar results. The 6 DoF modeling estimates bullet stability ((S_{d}) and (S_{g})) that gravitates to over-stabilization for ranges over 2,400 m (2,625 yd) for this bullet. At 2,400 m (2,625 yd) the total drop predictions deviate 47.5 cm (19.7 in) or 0.20 mil (0.68 moa) at 50° latitude and up to 2,700 m (2,953 yd) the total drop predictions are within 0.30 mil (1 moa) at 50° latitude. The 2016 Lapua Ballistics 6 DoF App version predictions were even closer to the Doppler radar test predictions.

The Pejsa drag model closed-form solution prediction method, without slope constant factor fine tuning, yields very similar results in the supersonic flight regime compared to the Doppler radar test derived drag coefficients (C_{d}) prediction method. At 1,500 m (1,640 yd) range the projectile velocity predictions deviate 10 m/s (32.8 ft/s), which equates to a predicted total drop difference of 23.6 cm (9.3 in) or 0.16 mil (0.54 moa) at 50° latitude.

==== G1 & G7 ====
These two models presuppose (distinct) assumptions about the shape of the bullet.

The traditional Siacci/Mayevski G1 drag curve model prediction method generally yields more optimistic results compared to the modern Doppler radar test derived drag coefficients (C_{d}) prediction method. (Note: The C_{d} data is used by engineers to create algorithms that utilize both known mathematical ballistic models as well as test specific, tabular data in unison to obtain predictions that are very close to actual flight behavior.) At 300 m (328 yd) range the differences will be hardly noticeable, but at 600 m (656 yd) and beyond the differences grow over 10 m/s (32.8 ft/s) projectile velocity and gradually become significant. At 1,500 m (1,640 yd) range the projectile velocity predictions deviate 25 m/s (82.0 ft/s), which equates to a predicted total drop difference of 125.6 cm (49.4 in) or 0.83 mil (2.87 moa) at 50° latitude.

The G7 drag curve model prediction method (recommended by some manufacturers for very-low-drag shaped rifle bullets) when using a G7 ballistic coefficient (BC) of 0.377 yields very similar results in the supersonic flight regime compared to the Doppler radar test derived drag coefficients (C_{d}) prediction method. At 1,500 m (1,640 yd) range the projectile velocity predictions have their maximum deviation of 10 m/s (32.8 ft/s). The predicted total drop difference at 1,500 m (1,640 yd) is 0.4 cm (0.16 in) at 50° latitude. The predicted total drop difference at 1,800 m (1,969 yd) is 45.0 cm (17.7 in), which equates to 0.25 mil (0.86 moa).

== External factors ==
=== Wind ===
Wind has a range of effects, the first being the effect of making the projectile deviate to the side (horizontal deflection). From a scientific perspective, the "wind pushing on the side of the projectile" is not what causes horizontal wind drift. What causes wind drift is drag. Drag makes the projectile turn into the wind, much like a weather vane, keeping the centre of air pressure on its nose. From the shooter’s perspective, this causes the nose of the projectile to turn into the wind and the tail to turn away from the wind. The result of this turning effect is that the drag pushes the projectile downwind in a nose-to-tail direction.

Wind also causes aerodynamic jump which is the vertical component of cross wind deflection caused by lateral (wind) impulses activated during free flight of a projectile or at or very near the muzzle leading to dynamic imbalance. The amount of aerodynamic jump is dependent on cross wind speed, the gyroscopic stability of the bullet at the muzzle and if the barrel twist is clockwise or anti-clockwise. Like the wind direction reversing the twist direction will reverse the aerodynamic jump direction.

A somewhat less obvious effect is caused by head or tailwinds. A headwind will slightly increase the relative velocity of the projectile, and increase drag and the corresponding drop. A tailwind will reduce the drag and the projectile/bullet drop. In the real world, pure head or tailwinds are rare, since wind is seldom constant in force and direction and normally interacts with the terrain it is blowing over. This often makes ultra long range shooting in head or tailwind conditions difficult.

=== Vertical angles ===
The vertical angle (or elevation) of a shot will also affect the trajectory of the shot. Ballistic tables for small calibre projectiles (fired from pistols or rifles) assume a horizontal line of sight between the shooter and target with gravity acting perpendicular to the earth. Therefore, if the shooter-to-target angle is up or down, (the direction of the gravity component does not change with slope direction), then the trajectory curving acceleration due to gravity will actually be less, in proportion to the cosine of the slant angle. As a result, a projectile fired upward or downward, on a so-called "slant range," will over-shoot the same target distance on flat ground. The effect is of sufficient magnitude that hunters must adjust their target hold off accordingly in mountainous terrain. A well known formula for slant range adjustment to horizontal range hold off is known as the Rifleman's rule. The Rifleman's rule and the slightly more complex and less well known Improved Rifleman's rule models produce sufficiently accurate predictions for many small arms applications. Simple prediction models however ignore minor gravity effects when shooting uphill or downhill. The only practical way to compensate for this is to use a ballistic computer program. Besides gravity at very steep angles over long distances, the effect of air density changes the projectile encounters during flight become problematic. The mathematical prediction models available for inclined fire scenarios, depending on the amount and direction (uphill or downhill) of the inclination angle and range, yield varying accuracy expectation levels. Less advanced ballistic computer programs predict the same trajectory for uphill and downhill shots at the same vertical angle and range. The more advanced programs factor in the small effect of gravity on uphill and on downhill shots resulting in slightly differing trajectories at the same vertical angle and range. No publicly available ballistic computer program currently (2017) accounts for the complicated phenomena of differing air densities the projectile encounters during flight.

=== Ambient air density ===
Air pressure, temperature, and humidity variations make up the ambient air density. Humidity has a counter intuitive impact. Since water vapor has a density of 0.8 grams per litre, while dry air averages about 1.225 grams per litre, higher humidity actually decreases the air density, and therefore decreases the drag.

=== Precipitation ===
Precipitation can cause significant yaw and accompanying deflection when a bullet collides with a raindrop. The further downrange such a coincidental collision occurs, the less the deflection on target will be. The weight of the raindrop and bullet also influences how much yaw is induced during such a collision. A big heavy raindrop and a light bullet will yield maximal yaw effect. A heavy bullet colliding with an equal raindrop will experience significant less yaw effect.

== Long range factors ==
=== Gyroscopic drift (spin drift) ===
Gyroscopic drift is an interaction of the bullet's mass and aerodynamics with the atmosphere that it is flying in. Even in completely calm air, with no sideways air movement at all, a spin-stabilized projectile will experience a spin-induced sideways component, due to a gyroscopic phenomenon known as "yaw of repose." For a right hand (clockwise) direction of rotation this component will always be to the right. For a left hand (counterclockwise) direction of rotation this component will always be to the left. This is because the projectile's longitudinal axis (its axis of rotation) and the direction of the velocity vector of the center of gravity (CG) deviate by a small angle, which is said to be the equilibrium yaw or the yaw of repose. The magnitude of the yaw of repose angle is typically less than 0.5 degree. Since rotating objects react with an angular velocity vector 90 degrees from the applied torque vector, the bullet's axis of symmetry moves with a component in the vertical plane and a component in the horizontal plane; for right-handed (clockwise) spinning bullets, the bullet's axis of symmetry deflects to the right and a little bit upward with respect to the direction of the velocity vector, as the projectile moves along its ballistic arc. As the result of this small inclination, there is a continuous air stream, which tends to deflect the bullet to the right. Thus the occurrence of the yaw of repose is the reason for the bullet drifting to the right (for right-handed spin) or to the left (for left-handed spin). This means that the bullet is "skidding" sideways at any given moment, and thus experiencing a sideways component.

The following variables affect the magnitude of gyroscopic drift:

- Projectile or bullet length: longer projectiles experience more gyroscopic drift because they produce more lateral "lift" for a given yaw angle.
- Spin rate: faster spin rates will produce more gyroscopic drift because the nose ends up pointing farther to the side.
- Range, time of flight and trajectory height: gyroscopic drift increases with all of these variables.
- density of the atmosphere: denser air will increase gyroscopic drift.

Doppler radar measurement results for the gyroscopic drift of several US military and other very-low-drag bullets at 1000 yards (914.4 m) look like this:

Bullet type	US military M193 Ball (5.56×45mm NATO)	US military M118 Special Ball (7.62×51mm NATO)	Palma Sierra MatchKing	LRBT J40 Match	Sierra MatchKing	Sierra MatchKing	LRBT J40 Match	LRBT J40 Match
Projectile mass (in grains and g)	55 grains (3.56 g)	173 grains (11.21 g)	155 grains (10.04 g)	190 grains (12.31 g)	220 grains (14.26 g)	300 grains (19.44 g)	350 grains (22.68 g)	419 grains (27.15 g)
Projectile diameter (in inches and mm)	.224 inches (5.69 mm)	.308 inches (7.82 mm)	.308 inches (7.82 mm)	.308 inches (7.82 mm)	.308 inches (7.82 mm)	.338 inches (8.59 mm)	.375 inches (9.53 mm)	.408 inches (10.36 mm)
Gyroscopic drift (in inches and mm)	23.00 inches (584.20 mm)	11.50 inches (292.10 mm)	12.75 inches (323.85 mm)	3.00 inches (76.20 mm)	7.75 inches (196.85 mm)	6.50 inches (165.10 mm)	0.87 inches (22.10 mm)	1.90 inches (48.26 mm)

The table shows that the gyroscopic drift cannot be predicted on weight and diameter alone. In order to make accurate predictions on gyroscopic drift several details about both the external and internal ballistics must be considered. Factors such as the twist rate of the barrel, the velocity of the projectile as it exits the muzzle, barrel harmonics, and atmospheric conditions, all contribute to the path of a projectile.

=== Magnus effect ===
The Magnus effect

Spin stabilized projectiles are affected by the Magnus effect, whereby the spin of the bullet creates a force acting either up or down, perpendicular to the sideways vector of the wind. In the simple case of horizontal wind, and a right hand (clockwise) direction of rotation, the Magnus effect induced pressure differences around the bullet cause a downward (wind from the right) or upward (wind from the left) force viewed from the point of firing to act on the projectile, affecting its point of impact. The vertical deflection value tends to be small in comparison with the horizontal wind induced deflection component, but it may nevertheless be significant in winds that exceed 4 m/s (14.4 km/h or 9 mph).

==== Magnus effect and bullet stability ====
The Magnus effect has a significant role in bullet stability because the Magnus force does not act upon the bullet's center of gravity, but the center of pressure affecting the yaw of the bullet. The Magnus effect will act as a destabilizing force on any bullet with a center of pressure located ahead of the center of gravity, while conversely acting as a stabilizing force on any bullet with the center of pressure located behind the center of gravity. The location of the center of pressure depends on the flow field structure, in other words, depending on whether the bullet is in supersonic, transonic or subsonic flight. What this means in practice depends on the shape and other attributes of the bullet, in any case the Magnus force greatly affects stability because it tries to "twist" the bullet along its flight path.

Paradoxically, very-low-drag bullets, owing to their length, have a tendency to exhibit greater Magnus destabilizing errors because they have a greater surface area to present to the oncoming air they are travelling through, thereby reducing their aerodynamic efficiency. This subtle effect is one of the reasons why a calculated C_{d} or BC based on shape and sectional density is of limited use.

=== Poisson effect ===
Another minor cause of drift, which depends on the nose of the projectile being above the trajectory, is the Poisson Effect. This, if it occurs at all, acts in the same direction as the gyroscopic drift and is even less important than the Magnus effect. It supposes that the uptilted nose of the projectile causes an air cushion to build up underneath it. It further supposes that there is an increase of friction between this cushion and the projectile so that the latter, with its spin, will tend to roll off the cushion and move sideways.

This simple explanation is quite popular. There is, however, no evidence to show that increased pressure means increased friction and unless this is so, there can be no effect. Even if it does exist it must be quite insignificant compared with the gyroscopic and Coriolis drifts.

Both the Poisson and Magnus Effects will reverse their directions of drift if the nose falls below the trajectory. When the nose is off to one side, as in equilibrium yaw, these effects will make minute alterations in range.

=== Coriolis drift ===
The Coriolis effect causes Coriolis drift in a direction perpendicular to the Earth's axis; for most locations on Earth and firing directions, this deflection includes horizontal and vertical components. The deflection is to the right of the trajectory in the northern hemisphere, to the left in the southern hemisphere, upward for eastward shots, and downward for westward shots. The vertical Coriolis deflection is also known as the Eötvös effect. Coriolis drift is not an aerodynamic effect; it is a consequence of the rotation of the Earth.

The magnitude of the Coriolis effect is small. For small arms, the magnitude of the Coriolis effect is generally insignificant (for high powered rifles in the order of about 10 cm (3.9 in) at 1,000 m (1,094 yd)), but for ballistic projectiles with long flight times, such as extreme long-range rifle projectiles, artillery, and rockets like intercontinental ballistic missiles, it is a significant factor in calculating the trajectory. The magnitude of the drift depends on the firing and target location, azimuth of firing, projectile velocity and time of flight.

==== Horizontal effect ====
Viewed from a non-rotating reference frame (i.e. not one rotating with the Earth) and ignoring the forces of gravity and air resistance, a projectile moves in a straight line. When viewed from a reference frame fixed with respect to the Earth, that straight trajectory appears to curve sideways. The direction of this horizontal curvature is to the right in the northern hemisphere and to the left in the southern hemisphere, and does not depend on the azimuth of the shot. The horizontal curvature is largest at the poles and decreases to zero at the equator.

==== Vertical (Eötvös) effect ====
The Eötvös effect changes the perceived gravitational pull on a moving object based on the relationship between the direction and velocity of movement and the direction of the Earth's rotation.

The Eötvös effect is largest at the equator and decreases to zero at the poles. It causes eastward-traveling projectiles to deflect upward, and westward-traveling projectiles to deflect downward. The effect is less pronounced for trajectories in other directions, and is zero for trajectories aimed due north or south. In the case of large changes of momentum, such as a spacecraft being launched into Earth orbit, the effect becomes significant. It contributes to the fastest and most fuel-efficient path to orbit: a launch from the equator that curves to a directly eastward heading.

== Equipment factors ==
Though not forces acting on projectile trajectories there are some equipment related factors that influence trajectories. Since these factors can cause otherwise unexplainable external ballistic flight behavior they have to be briefly mentioned.

=== Lateral jump ===
Lateral jump is caused by a slight lateral and rotational movement of a gun barrel at the instant of firing. It has the effect of a small error in bearing. The effect is ignored, since it is small and varies from round to round.

=== Lateral throw-off ===
Lateral throw-off is caused by mass imbalance in applied spin stabilized projectiles or pressure imbalances during the transitional flight phase when a projectile leaves a gun barrel off axis leading to static imbalance. If present it causes dispersion. The effect is unpredictable, since it is generally small and varies from projectile to projectile, round to round and/or gun barrel to gun barrel.

== Using ballistics data ==
Here is an example of a ballistic table for a .30 calibre Speer 169 grain (11 g) pointed boat tail match bullet, with a BC of 0.480. It assumes sights 1.5 inches (38 mm) above the bore line, and sights adjusted to result in point of aim and point of impact matching 200 yards (183 m) and 300 yards (274 m) respectively.

Range		0	100 yd 91 m	200 yd 183 m	300 yd 274 m	400 yd 366 m	500 yd 457 m
Velocity	(ft/s)	2,700	2,512	2,331	2,158	1,992	1,834
Velocity	(m/s)	823	766	710	658	607	559
Zeroed for 200 yards/184 m
Height	(in)	−1.5	2.0	0	−8.4	−24.3	−49.0
Height	(mm)	−38	51	0	−213	−617	−1245
Zeroed for 300 yards/274 m
Height	(in)	−1.5	4.8	5.6	0	−13.1	−35.0
Height	(mm)	−38	122	142	0	−333	−889

This table demonstrates that, even with a fairly aerodynamic bullet fired at high velocity, the "bullet drop" or change in the point of impact is significant.

== See also ==
- Internal ballistics - The behavior of the projectile and propellant before it leaves the barrel.
- Transitional ballistics - The behavior of the projectile from the time it leaves the muzzle until the pressure behind the projectile is equalized.
- Terminal ballistics - The behavior of the projectile upon impact with the target.
- Trajectory of a projectile - Basic external ballistics mathematic formulas.
- Rifleman's rule - Procedures or "rules" for a rifleman for aiming at targets at a distance either uphill or downhill.
- Franklin Ware Mann - Early scientific study of external ballistics.
- Table of handgun and rifle cartridges
- Sighting in - Calibrating the sights on a ranged weapon so that the point of aim intersects with the trajectory at a given distance, allowing the user to consistently hit the target being aimed at.
