= James Monroe Ingalls =

James Monroe Ingalls

James Monroe Ingalls (January 25, 1837 – May 1, 1927) was an American soldier and an authority on ballistics. His tabulations on ballistics was the authoritative source for over 100 years.

== Early life ==
Ingalls was born January 25, 1837, in Sutton Township, Caledonia County, Vermont. He was the youngest of 9 children of James Ingalls (circa 1792–1866) and Mary Cass (circa 1797–1883). His parents are buried in Forest Hill Cemetery, Madison, Dane County, Wisconsin. He had a sister, Jane Margaret Ingalls (1821–1920), who married Estes Wilson. Jane Ingalls Wilson was one of the first female physicians in Wisconsin.

Ingalls spent his childhood in Clinton, Massachusetts. He worked as an errand boy at Lancaster Mills and graduated from Clinton High School in 1856.

== Civil War ==
James Monroe Ingalls moved to Madison, Wisconsin, with his parents in about 1856. He was a professor of mathematics in the Evansville Seminary, Wisconsin, 1860–1863. He enlisted in the regular army on January 2, 1864, during the Civil War, and was assigned to the 16th Infantry. He was promoted corporal and served as commissary and quartermaster-sergeant until May 21, 1865. He was promoted 2d and 1st lieutenant on May 3, 1865, accepting the promotions on May 21, 1865. On April 17, 1869, he was transferred to the 2d Infantry; on January 1, 1871, to the 1st artillery. He was Commandant of Cadets and Professor of Military Science and Tactics and Mathematics at West Virginia University 1877–78. He was a very popular professor. He was promoted captain of artillery on July 1, 1880; major on June 1, 1897, and lieutenant-colonel on October 5, 1900. He served in Tennessee, Alabama, Georgia and other points in the south between 1864 and 1871, and was then sent to the artillery school at Fort Monroe, graduating in the class of 1872. He was then stationed successively at Plattsburgh Barracks, and Forts Jefferson and Barrancas, and, in July 1880, was assigned to the command of Battery A, Governor's Island, New York Harbor, and thence transferred to San Francisco Harbor, where he served until ordered to Battery G at Fort Munroe 1882. He suggested and organized the department of ballistics at the artillery school, Fort Monroe, and was made the first instructor on December 19, 1882, which position he held until the school suspended operations in spring 1898 because of the Spanish–American War. He was also senior instructor in practical artillery exercises, class of 1884; in engineering, class of 1888; in electricity and defensive torpedoes, classes of 1884, 1886, 1888 and 1890; and in signaling, 1884–88. Lieutenant Colonel Ingalls retired from the Army in 1901. In 1904, he was made colonel retired. Ingalls died on May 1, 1927, in Providence, Rhode Island, and is buried in Cedar Grove Cemetery, New London, Connecticut.

Author A. J. Bastarache has called Colonel Ingalls the "Father of Ballistics" for his pioneering research that contributed to America's military successes through the 20th century.

== Family life ==
Ingalls married Elizabeth Niles, daughter of John S. Niles and Elizabeth Lilly, in July 1860, in Dane County, Wisconsin. She was born in 1841 in Leon, Cattaraugus County, New York, and died on July 28, 1875, of typhoid fever at Fort Barrancas, Escambia County, Florida, and is buried in the national cemetery there. They had two children. Their son, Arthur Niles Ingalls (1861–1875), also died of typhoid fever and is buried with his mother. Their daughter, Hilda Eliza Ingalls (born September 1868 in McPhersonburg, Virginia) married Joel Randall Burrow in 1889. He later became the Secretary of State of the State of Kansas. Hilda died on November 4, 1908, and is buried at Fairview Cemetery, Smith Center, Kansas.

Ingalls married a second time on July 17, 1877, in New London, Connecticut, to Harriet Elizabeth Thurston, daughter of Benjamin Babcock Thurston, who had been Lieutenant Governor of Rhode Island. They had one child, Fanny Thurston Ingalls, who never married.

== Publications ==
- Exterior Ballistics (1883, 1885, 1886)
- Ballistic Machines (1885)
- Handbook of Problems in Exterior Ballistics (1890; 1901)
- Ballistic Tables (1891; 1900)
- Interior Ballistics (1894; third edition, 1912)
- Ballistics for the Instruction of Artillery Gunners (1893)
