= VPT =

VPT may refer to:

- Valor por Tamaulipas
- Vermont Public Television
- Volume, temperature and pressure, the three parameters in the combined gas law
- Valtion Patruunatehdas, a Finnish firearms ammunition manufacturer
