= Joselyn Alejandra Niño =

Mexican suspected Gulf Cartel assassin

- Born: Joselyn Alejandra Niño; Mexico
- Died: 13 April 2015; Matamoros, Tamaulipas, Mexico
- Other name: La Flaca
- Occupation: Assassin
- Employer: Gulf Cartel (suspected)

Joselyn Alejandra Niño (died on 13 April 2015), commonly referred to by her alias La Flaca (English: The Skinny One), was a Mexican suspected assassin of the Gulf Cartel, a criminal group based in Tamaulipas, Mexico. She gained popularity on social media on 5 January 2015, when an anonymous person uploaded a picture of her posing with a firearm in an organized crime leak page. The post identified her as a Gulf Cartel member based out of Río Bravo. As a foot soldier, she was responsible for fighting off cells of Los Metros, a rival faction of Los Ciclones, a Gulf Cartel subgroup she belonged to.

She was found dead on 13 April 2015, when Mexican authorities discovered her dismembered body inside an ice cooler at a parking lot in Matamoros. Her body had visible signs of torture. She was identified by her distinctive tattoo on her forearm displaying "Niño", her surname. At the scene, investigators also found another dismembered female and a decapitated man who were reportedly also members of Los Ciclones. A written message at the scene stated she was killed by Los Metros.

== Career ==
Joselyn Alejandra Niño was a suspected assassin of the Gulf Cartel, a criminal group based in Tamaulipas. She was commonly referred by her alias La Flaca (English: The Skinny One). (Note: She is not the first female organized crime assassin to have this alias. There are at least three recorded cases of other women having the same nickname.) This nickname was given to her by the Gulf Cartel for her slim body. This moniker is also a reference to Our Lady of Holy Death, a female skeleton saint venerated by thousands in Mexico and popular among some drug traffickers. Organized crime groups in Mexico often recruit females like Niño for their build and girly looks to disguise them from rival gangsters and law enforcement. Women like Niño sometimes begin their criminal careers as organized crime lookouts or prostitutes before they climb their way up to foot soldier ranks.

Niño gained notoriety on social media on 5 January 2015, when an anonymous online user leaked a picture of her to Valor por Tamaulipas, a citizen journalist page that post security updates and organized crime leaks. Her pictures made it to Facebook and Twitter. The picture identified her as a Gulf Cartel hitwoman based out of Río Bravo, Tamaulipas; she was smiling in front of the camera and posing with a firearm and bullet proof vest. (Note: Another source stated it was a Kevlar jacket.) She was resting her sunglasses on her head and was wearing a golden necklace. The picture's background stirred commentary on the apparent low-income lifestyle of cartel-employed assassins, which seemed to contradict the notion that those working for organized crime groups in Mexico live luxuriously. In addition, others discussed in the comment section whether or not lifestyles like Niño's were worth the risk when organized crime bosses reportedly enjoy most of the luxuries. Her picture was shared more than 40 times and had over 1,500 likes on Facebook.

According to investigators, the leak was likely done by a member of Los Metros, a Gulf Cartel faction that was at war with Los Ciclones, the faction that Niño reportedly belonged to. Infighting between these groups had started in January 2015. They suspect this was done to weaken Los Ciclones and promote more leaks of its members on social media platforms. Throughout early 2015, members of the Gulf Cartel leaked information of their rivals on social media to display them publicly in hopes that they could be arrested by security forces or killed by rival gangsters. Niño's faction was headed by suspected Gulf Cartel leader Ángel Eduardo Prado Rodríguez (alias "Ciclón 7"); Los Metros faction was headed by suspected leaders José Hugo Rodríguez Sánchez (alias "El Gafe"), Juan Manuel Loisa Salinas (alias "Comandante Toro"), and Juan Francisco Carrizales (alias "Metro 98").

Niño worked under Ciclón 7 and was responsible for fighting off Los Metros for at least four months. Her group was entasked with preventing incursions of Los Metros in Río Bravo from Reynosa, Tamaulipas. Río Bravo, where Niño was based, was mostly a turf controlled by Los Metros, which meant that Los Ciclones were at greater risk when conducting operations there. When Niño's picture was leaked on social media, she was identified by members of Los Metros. Sometime between 12 and 13 April, Los Metros captured her along with two accomplices from Los Ciclones.

== Death ==
On 13 April 2015, Mexican authorities in Matamoros, Tamaulipas, discovered Niño's dismembered body inside an ice cooler. The cooler was abandoned at a Soriana parking lot. (Note: This Soriana is known as Soriana Lauro Villar. The parking lot is close to the Veterans International Bridge at Los Tomates that connects Matamoros with Brownsville, Texas, U.S.) The rest of her remains were found inside plastic bags. At the scene, the perpetrators also left another dismembered female corpse and a decapitated man. Investigators suspect that the two people killed with Niño were also members of Los Ciclones. The bodies showed signs of torture, likely done to extract information of their criminal activities. They were then believed to have been executed with a headshot and dismembered. Investigators were able to identify her remains due to her distinctive tattoo with the word "Niño", her surname, on her forearm. She was estimated to be in her late teens or early twenties. (Note: Based on her approximate age at the time of her death, she was born in the 1990s.)

Pictures of the dismembered bodies were first posted on Twitter by Los Metros. The pictures were intended to be a warning for Niño's faction. In one of the pictures, Niño was shown beaten on the ground with the two other victims prior to her dismemberment. In a second photo, her remains were seen inside the cooler. Alongside the bodies, Los Metros left a written message threatening Los Ciclones. "This will happen to all the filthy who support Los Ciclones ... Keep sending these fucking assholes", the message read. The message also criticized Los Ciclones for using female foot soldiers, and told them they were going to be killing more people in their turf. The message was signed by a member of Los Metros who goes by the moniker "65". (Note: M65 was himself murdered in an ambush on 23 March 2015 several weeks before Niño's death.)

== See also ==
- Mexican drug war
- Women in the Mexican drug war
