= La Flaca =

La Flaca may refer to:

- La Flaca (Jarabe de Palo album), 1996, or the title song
- La Flaca (Los Freddy's album), 1967
- El Gordo y la Flaca, a Spanish language entertainment news show
- Yazmith Bataz (born 1972), Mexican athlete nicknamed "La Flaca"
- Joselyn Alejandra Niño, Mexican suspected hitwoman nicknamed "La Flaca"
- "La Flaca", a nickname for la Santa Muerte

== See also ==
- Flaca (disambiguation)
