= Flaca =

Flaca may refer to:

- Flaçà, a town in Spain
- Marisol Gonzales, a character in Orange is the New Black, nicknamed "Flaca"

== See also ==
- La Flaca (disambiguation)
- Flakka, the street name for alpha-Pyrrolidinopentiophenone
