= Nammo =

Norwegian-Finnish aerospace and defence company

Nammo AS
- Type: Private
- Industry: Defense industry Aerospace industry
- Founded: 1998; 28 years ago
- Headquarters: Raufoss, Norway
- Key people: Morten Brandtzæg (CEO)
- Products: Ammunition, missiles, explosives, rocket engines, and propulsion systems
- Revenue: NOK 7.45 billion (2022)
- Number of employees: 2,800 (2022)
- Parent: Ministry of Trade and Industry (Norway) (50%); Patria 50% (50.1% owned by the government of Finland and 49.9% by Kongsberg Gruppen)
- Subsidiaries: Nammo Lapua
- Website: www.nammo.com

Nammo, short for Nordic Ammunition Company, is a Norwegian-Finnish aerospace and defence group specialized in production of ammunition, rocket engines and space applications. The company has subsidiaries in Finland, Germany, Norway, Sweden, Switzerland, Spain, the United Kingdom, Ireland, and the United States. The company ownership is evenly split between the Norwegian government (represented by the Norwegian Ministry of Trade, Industry and Fisheries) and the Finnish defence company Patria. The company has its headquarters in Raufoss, Norway.

The company has four business units: Small and Medium Caliber Ammunition, Large Caliber Systems, Aerospace Propulsion, and Commercial Ammunition.

== History ==
Nammo was founded in 1998 by Raufoss (Norway), Patria (Finland), and Celsius (Sweden). The Lapua cartridge factory in Lapua, Finland, is also part of the Nammo group as Nammo Lapua Oy. In 2005, the present joint ownership between Patria and the Norwegian government was established.

In 2007, Nammo acquired the US munitions company Talley, Inc. after purchasing 100% of its shares.

== Controversies ==
Norwegian export control laws prohibit Norwegian companies from selling munitions to countries at war or conflict. Nammo's then information director, Sissel Solum, said Nammo bears no responsibility for the use of their munitions after purchase, although some claimed (including the Norwegian Church Aid and PRIO) that this is a breach of the intended spirit of national export regulations.

In 2009, it was revealed that the Israel Defense Forces purchased 28,000 M72 LAWs from Nammo Talley, along with weapons parts and training missiles valued at NOK 600 million. These munitions were later used in Operation Cast Lead. According to Nammo Raufoss AS managing director, Lars Harald Lied, the company also produces 12.7mm "Multi-Purpose" ammunition that was used by both American and Norwegian soldiers in the War in Afghanistan.

== Products ==
=== Current production ===
==== Missiles parts and assembly ====
- Propulsion
  - AIM-9L Sidewinder - propellant production
  - AIM-120 AMRAAM - solid rocket motor
  - IRIS-T family:
    - IRIS-T (air-to-air) - solid rocket motor
    - IRIS-T SLS (same missile as air-to-air variant) - solid rocket motor
    - IRIS-T SLM - solid rocket motor
    - IRIS-T SLX - solid rocket motor
    - IDAS (interactive defence & attack for submarines) - solid rocket motor
  - Thales LMM - solid rocket motor
  - Naval strike missile - rocket booster
  - Penguin Mk2 Mod7 (helicopter launched) - solid rocket motor
  - RIM-162 ESSM - solid rocket motor
  - SM40 Exocet - rocket booster

==== Orbital launch vehicle ====
- Rockets:
  - Nammo Space Nucleus Sounding Rocket
- Rocket parts:
  - Rocket propulsion:
    - Nammo manufactures the separation rocket motors for Ariane 6, and in the past manufactured them for the Ariane 5.
    - P120 Booster Igniter for the Vega and Ariane 6 rockets
    - 220N Monopropellant Thruster - Nammo’s green propulsion technologies for Roll and Attitude Control Systems
    - Unitary Motor 1, a 30 kN hybrid engine for the Nucleus Sounding Rocket
  - Propellant tanks:
    - Aluminium propellant tank for the Vega upper stage AVUM
- Satellites:
  - In January 2013, Nammo and the Andøya Rocket Range spaceport announced that they would be "developing an orbital Nanosatellite launch vehicle (NLV) rocket system called North Star that uses a standardized hybrid motor, clustered in different numbers and arrangements, to build two types of sounding rockets and an orbital launcher", able to deliver a 10 kg (22 lb) nanosat into polar orbit.

==== Small calibre ammunition ====
- 5.56×45mm NATO
- 6.5×47mm Lapua
- 7.62×51mm NATO and .308 Winchester
- 7.62×53mmR
- .30-06 Springfield (7.62×63mm)
- .338 Lapua Magnum (8.6×70mm)
- 9×19mm Parabellum
- 12.7×99mm (.50 BMG)
- 12.7×99 mm Raufoss Mk 211 multipurpose

==== Medium calibre ammunition ====
As of 2024, Nammo produced the following non-exhaustive list of medium:

- Cartridges
  - 20×102mm
  - 20×128mm
  - 20×139mm
  - 25×137mm
  - 27×145mm
  - 30×113mm
  - 30×173mm
  - 30×173mm Swimmer (APFSDS-T MK 258 Mod 1)
  - 35×228mm
  - 57mm L/70 3P
- Grenade for grenade launcher
  - 40 mm RF AIRBURST AMMUNITION
  - 40×53mm HV

==== Indirect fire ammunition ====
- Propellant charges for artillery and mortars
- Mortar shells (60, 81 and 120mm)
  - HE
  - IR smoke
  - Illuminating
- Artillery shell bodies (155mm)

==== Tank ammunition ====
- 120 mm tank ammunition
  - HE target practice
  - HE
  - Kinetic Energy Target Practice
  - IM Canister

==== Other types of ammunitions ====
- Hand grenades
  - SOHG (Scalable Offensive Hand Grenade)
  - HGO50-3.5 (offensive hand grenade)
  - HGO225-3.5 (offensive hand grenade)
  - Fragmentation increment sleeve for offensive hand grenade
  - M67 hand grenade
  - HGF165-3.5 (fragmentation hand grenade)
  - Training hand grenades
  - TTC Smoke grenade
- Ignition systems
- APOBS Mk7 Mod2 (Anti-personnel breaching system)
- Warheads
  - 70 mm rocket warhead

==== Shoulder-fired systems ====
Nammo has manufactured shoulder-fired systems since the 1960s, with licence production of the M72 LAW beginning at Raufoss in Norway in 1966. In 2007, Nammo acquired the US munitions company Talley, Inc. after purchasing 100% of its shares. Today, Nammo has operations in ten places in the US (Nammo Defense Systems Inc.) and is the only licensed manufacturer of the M72 LAW, with production lines in Raufoss and Mesa, Arizona.

In addition to the M72, Mesa also manufactures the M141 Bunker Defeat Munition for the United States Army, while Nammo's facilities in Columbus, Mississippi, manufactures ammunition for the SMAW system for the United States Marine Corps.

Nammo Defense Systems Inc., Mesa, Arizona, was awarded a $498,092,926 firm-fixed-price contract for the full rate production of M72 light assault weapon variants and components for shoulder-launched munitions training systems on 20 December 2021.

=== Products in development ===
==== Missiles parts ====
- THOR-ER - ramjet missile engine in development
- NSM-SL - a submarine launched Naval Strike Missile, participating to the study of a submarine variant, focusing on the rocket boosting system for a submarine launched weapon
- Nammo develops with Northrop Grumman the Mk72 solid rocket motor for the first stage of the future Raytheon SM-3 Block1B missile of the US Navy.

== Rocket engine consultancy and development ==
In 2019, Nammo was awarded an ESA contract to initiate development of a reusable rocket engine for the ascent stage of the Heracles lunar lander. The engine may be fed by electrically driven pumps, from low pressure propellant tanks, which may enable in-space refueling.
