= Booster separation motor =

Booster separation motors fire

The booster separation motors or BSMs on the Space Shuttle were relatively small rocket motors that separated the reusable solid rocket boosters (SRB) from the orbiter after SRB burnout. Eight booster separation motors were attached to each of the shuttle's two reusable solid rocket boosters, four on the forward frustum and four on the aft skirt.

About two minutes into a Space Shuttle flight, all 16 of these motors were fired simultaneously for 1.2 seconds, providing the precise thrust required to safely separate the spent boosters from the Space Shuttle's external tank and orbiter, while traveling more than 1,300 metres per second (2,900 mph) and an altitude of approximately 44 kilometres (27 mi).

The booster separation motors were produced by ATK Launch Systems Group, part of Alliant Techsystems (ATK) Inc., at their facility in Brigham City, Utah. The Booster separation motors each weighed 167 pounds (76 kg) when loaded with propellant, and 90 pounds (41 kg) when empty. They were 31.1 inches (79 cm) long and 12.88 inches (32.7 cm) in diameter.

Northrop Grumman is now manufacturing the booster separation motors for the Space Launch System Boosters, part of the NASA Space Launch System (SLS) for the Artemis program.

For Ariane 5 and Ariane 6, a Norwegian-Finnish company Nammo manufactures similar but different booster separation motors.
