= Space Shuttle Solid Rocket Booster =

Solid propellant rocket used by the Space Shuttle

Space Shuttle SRB
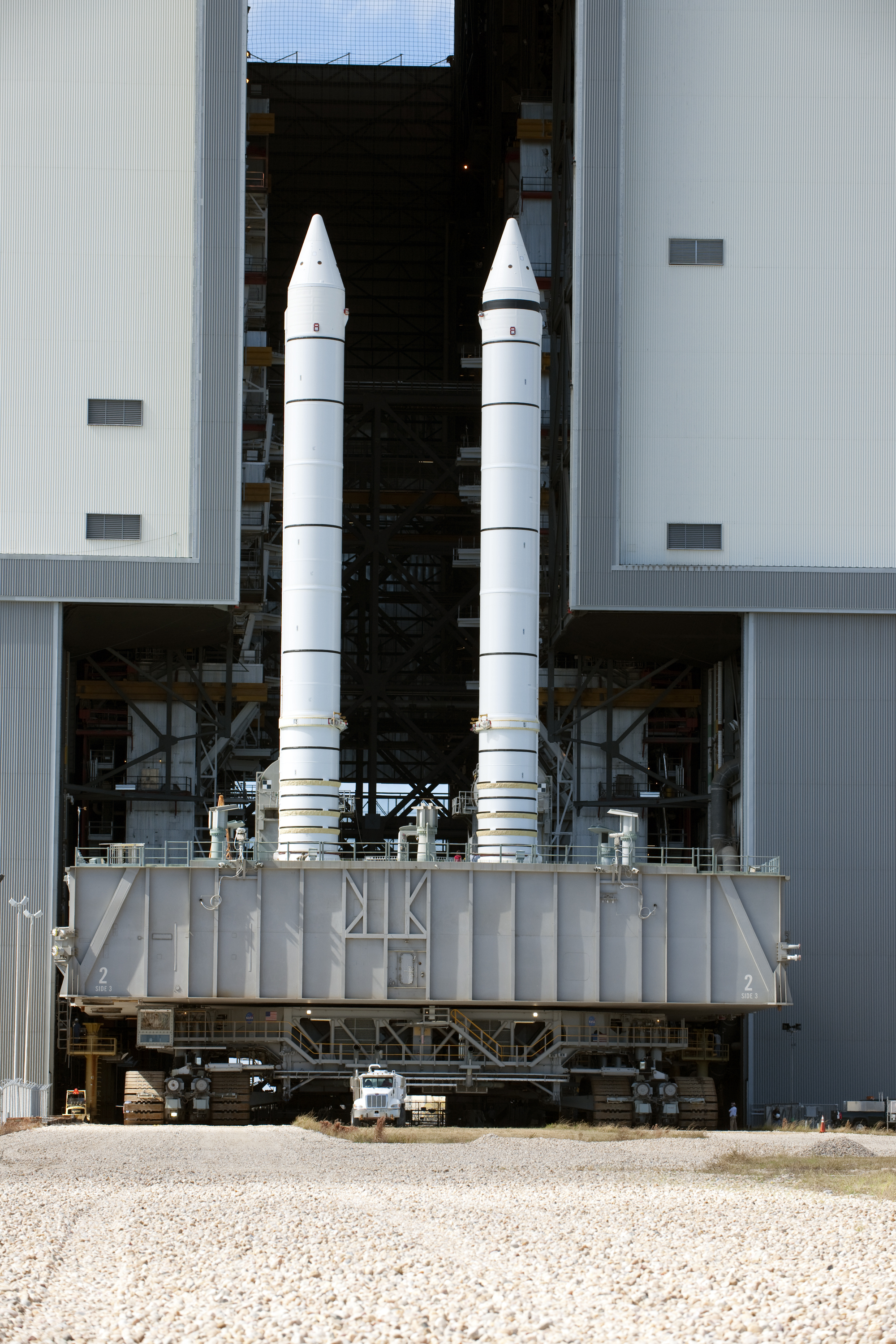
- Two Space Shuttle SRBs on the crawler-transporter in preparation for the launch of STS-134
- Manufacturer: Thiokol, later Alliant Techsystems (part of Northrop Grumman since 2015); United Space Boosters Inc. (Pratt & Whitney subsidiary), later United Space Alliance
- Country of origin: United States
- Used on: Space Shuttle

4-segment SRB
- Height: 149.16 ft (45.46 m)
- Diameter: 12.17 ft (3.71 m)
- Empty mass: 200,000 lb (91 t)
- Gross mass: 1,300,000 lb (590 t)
- Propellant mass: 1,100,000 lb (500 t)
- Maximum thrust: 3,300,000 lb_{f} (15,000 kN)
- Specific impulse: 268 s (2.63 km/s)
- Burn time: 123 seconds
- Propellant: APCP (AP / Al / PBAN)

The Space Shuttle Solid Rocket Booster (SRB) was the first solid-propellant rocket to be used for primary propulsion on a vehicle used for human spaceflight. The two SRBs provided 85% of the Space Shuttle's thrust at liftoff and for the first two minutes of ascent. After burnout, they were jettisoned, and parachuted into the Atlantic Ocean, where they were recovered, examined, refurbished, and reused.

The Space Shuttle SRBs were the most powerful solid rocket motors ever flown at the time of their debut. The Space Launch System (SLS) SRBs, adapted from the shuttle, surpassed it as the most powerful solid rocket motors ever flown, after the launch of the Artemis 1 mission in 2022. Each Space Shuttle SRB provided a maximum 14.7 MN (3,300,000 lbf) thrust, roughly double the most powerful single-combustion chamber liquid-propellant rocket engine ever flown, the Rocketdyne F-1. With a combined mass of about 1,180 metric tons (2,600,000 lb), they comprised over half the mass of the Shuttle stack at liftoff.

The motor segments of the SRBs were manufactured by Thiokol of Brigham City, Utah, which was later purchased by Alliant Techsystems (ATK). The prime contractor for the integration of all the components and retrieval of the spent SRBs, was United Space Boosters Inc., a subsidiary of Pratt & Whitney. The contract was subsequently transitioned to United Space Alliance, a joint venture of Boeing and Lockheed Martin.

Out of 270 SRBs launched over the Shuttle program, all but four were recovered – those from STS-4 (due to a parachute malfunction) and STS-51-L (destroyed by the range safety officer during the Challenger disaster). Over 5,000 parts were refurbished for reuse after each flight. The final set of SRBs that launched STS-135 included parts that had flown on 59 previous missions, including STS-1. Recovery also allowed post-flight examination of the boosters, identification of anomalies, and incremental design improvements. Refurbished segments have been used on the solid rocket boosters of the SLS.

== Overview ==
Solid Rocket Booster (SRB) separation during STS-117

The two reusable SRBs provided the main thrust to lift the shuttle off the launch pad and up to an altitude of about 150,000 ft (28 mi; 46 km). While on the pad, the two SRBs carried the entire weight of the external tank and orbiter and transmitted the weight load through their structure to the mobile launcher platform. Each booster had a liftoff thrust of approximately 12 meganewtons (2,800,000 pounds-force) at sea level, increasing shortly after liftoff to 14.7 MN (3,300,000 lbf). They were ignited after the three RS-25 main engines' thrust level was verified. Seventy-five seconds after SRB separation, SRB apogee occurred at an altitude of approximately 220,000 ft (42 mi; 36 nmi; 67 km); parachutes were then deployed and impact occurred in the ocean approximately 122 nautical miles (226 km; 140 mi) downrange, after which the two SRBs were recovered. The SRBs helped take the Space Shuttle to an altitude of 28 miles (24 nmi; 45 km) and a speed of 3,094 mph (4,979 km/h) along with the main engines.

The SRBs committed the shuttle to liftoff and ascent, without the possibility of launch abort, until both motors had fully consumed their propellants and had simultaneously been jettisoned by explosive bolts and thrusters to push them away from the Shuttle. Only then could any conceivable set of launch or post-liftoff abort procedures be contemplated. In addition, failure of an individual SRB's thrust output or ability to adhere to the designed performance profile was probably not survivable.

The SRBs were the largest solid-propellant motors ever flown until 2022 and the first solid-propellant rockets designed for reuse. Each is 149.16 ft (45.46 m) long and 12.17 ft (3.71 m) in diameter. Each SRB weighed approximately 1,300,000 lb (590 t) at launch. The two SRBs constituted about 69% of the total lift-off mass. The primary propellants were ammonium perchlorate as the oxidizer along with aluminum powder and PBAN as fuel. The total propellant load for each solid rocket motor weighed approximately 1,100,000 lb (500 t) (see § Propellant). The inert weight of each SRB was approximately 200,000 pounds (91 t).

Primary elements of each booster were the motor (including case, propellant, igniter, and nozzle), structure, separation systems, operational flight instrumentation, recovery avionics, pyrotechnics, deceleration system, thrust vector control system, and range safety destruct system.

While the terms solid rocket motor and solid rocket booster are often used interchangeably, in technical use they have specific meanings. The term solid rocket motor applied to the propellant, case, igniter and nozzle. Solid rocket booster applied to the entire rocket assembly, which included the rocket motor as well as the recovery parachutes, electronic instrumentation, separation rockets, range safety destruct system, and thrust vector control.

Each booster was attached to the external tank at the SRB's aft frame by two lateral sway braces and a diagonal attachment. The forward end of each SRB was attached to the external tank at the forward end of the SRB's forward skirt. On the launch pad, each booster also was attached to the mobile launcher platform at the aft skirt by four holddown studs, with frangible nuts that were severed at liftoff.

The boosters were composed of seven individually manufactured steel segments. These were assembled in pairs by the manufacturer and then shipped to Kennedy Space Center by rail for final assembly. The segments were fixed together using circumferential tang, clevis, and clevis pin fastening, and sealed with O-rings (originally two, changed to three after the Challenger Disaster in 1986) and heat-resistant putty.

Labeled diagram of SRB

== Components ==
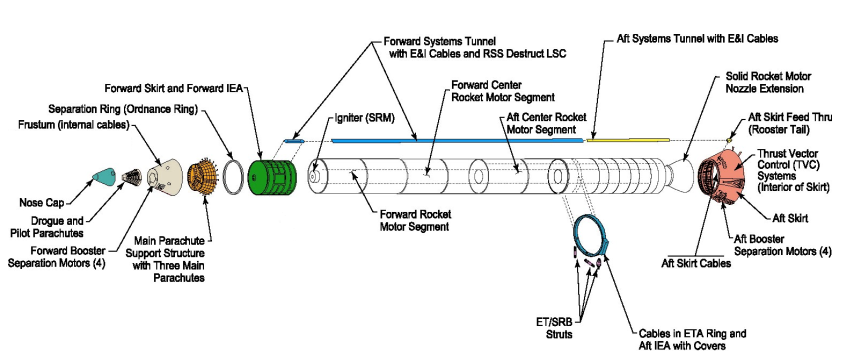
SRB Diagram

=== Hold-down posts ===
Each solid rocket booster had four hold-down posts that fit into corresponding support posts on the mobile launcher platform. Hold-down studs held the SRB and launcher platform posts together. Each stud had a nut at each end, the top one being a frangible nut. The top nut contained two explosive charges initiated by NASA standard detonators (NSDs), which were ignited at solid rocket motor ignition commands.

When the two NSDs were ignited at each hold down, the frangible nut fractured, releasing the hold-down stud. The stud traveled downward because of the release of tension in the stud (pretensioned before launch), NSD gas pressure and gravity. The stud was stopped by the stud deceleration stand, which contained sand. The hold-down stud was 28 in (710 mm) long and 3.5 in (89 mm) in diameter. The frangible nut was captured in a blast container mounted on the aft skirt of the SRB.

The solid rocket motor ignition commands were issued by the orbiter's computers through the master events controllers to the hold-down pyrotechnic initiator controllers (PICs) on the mobile launcher platform. They provided the ignition to the hold-down NSDs. The launch processing system monitored the SRB hold-down PICs for low voltage during the last 16 seconds before launch. PIC low voltage would initiate a launch hold.

=== Electrical power distribution ===
Electrical power distribution in each SRB consisted of orbiter-supplied main DC bus power to each SRB via SRB buses labeled A, B and C. Orbiter main DC buses A, B and C supplied main DC bus power to corresponding SRB buses A, B and C. In addition, orbiter main DC bus C supplied backup power to SRB buses A and B, and orbiter bus B supplied backup power to SRB bus C. This electrical power distribution arrangement allowed all SRB buses to remain powered in the event one orbiter main bus failed.

The nominal operating voltage was 28 ± 4 volts DC.

=== Hydraulic power units ===
Each SRB consists of two self-contained, independent Hydraulic Power Units (HPUs), used to actuate the thrust vector control (TVC) system. Each HPU consisted of an auxiliary power unit (APU), fuel supply module, hydraulic pump, hydraulic reservoir and hydraulic fluid manifold assembly. The APUs were fueled by hydrazine and generated mechanical shaft power to drive a hydraulic pump that produced hydraulic pressure for the SRB hydraulic system. The two separate HPUs and two hydraulic systems were located on the aft end of each SRB between the SRB nozzle and aft skirt. The HPU components were mounted on the aft skirt between the rock and tilt actuators. The two systems operated from T minus 28 seconds until SRB separation from the orbiter and external tank. The two independent hydraulic systems were connected to the nozzle rock and tilt servoactuators.

The HPU controller electronics were located in the SRB aft integrated electronic assemblies (IEAs) on the aft external tank attach rings.

The HPUs and their fuel systems were isolated from each other. Each fuel supply module (tank) contained 22 lb (10.0 kg) of hydrazine. The fuel tank was pressurized with gaseous nitrogen at 400 psi (2.8 MPa), which provided the force to expel (positive expulsion) the fuel from the tank to the fuel distribution line, maintaining a positive fuel supply to the APU throughout its operation.

In the APU, a fuel pump boosted the hydrazine pressure and fed it to a gas generator. The gas generator catalytically decomposed the hydrazine into hot, high-pressure gas; a two-stage turbine converted this into mechanical power, driving a gearbox. The waste gas, now cooler and at low pressure, was passed back over the gas generator housing to cool it before being dumped overboard. The gearbox drove the fuel pump, its own lubrication pump, and the HPU hydraulic pump. A startup bypass line went around the pump and fed the gas generator using the nitrogen tank pressure until the APU speed was such that the fuel pump outlet pressure exceeded that of the bypass line, at which point all the fuel was supplied to the fuel pump.

When the APU speed reached 100%, the APU primary control valve closed, and the APU speed was controlled by the APU controller electronics. If the primary control valve logic failed to the open state, the secondary control valve assumed control of the APU at 112% speed.

Each HPU on an SRB was connected to both servoactuators on that SRB by a switching valve that allowed the hydraulic power to be distributed from either HPU to both actuators if necessary. Each HPU served as the primary hydraulic source for one servoactuator, and a secondary source for the other servoactuator. Each HPU possessed the capacity to provide hydraulic power to both servoactuators within 115% operational limits in the event that hydraulic pressure from the other HPU should drop below 2,050 psi (14.1 MPa). A switch contact on the switching valve closed when the valve was in the secondary position. When the valve was closed, a signal was sent to the APU controller, that inhibited the 100% APU speed control logic and enabled the 112% APU speed control logic. The 100-percent APU speed enabled one APU/HPU to supply sufficient operating hydraulic pressure to both servoactuators of that SRB.

The APU 100-percent speed corresponded to 72,000 rpm, 110% to 79,200 rpm, and 112% to 80,640 rpm.

The hydraulic pump speed was 3,600 rpm and supplied hydraulic pressure of 3,050 ± 50 psi (21.03 ± 0.34 MPa). A high pressure relief valve provided overpressure protection to the hydraulic system and relieved at 3,750 psi (25.9 MPa).

The APUs/HPUs and hydraulic systems were reusable for 20 missions.

=== Thrust vector control ===
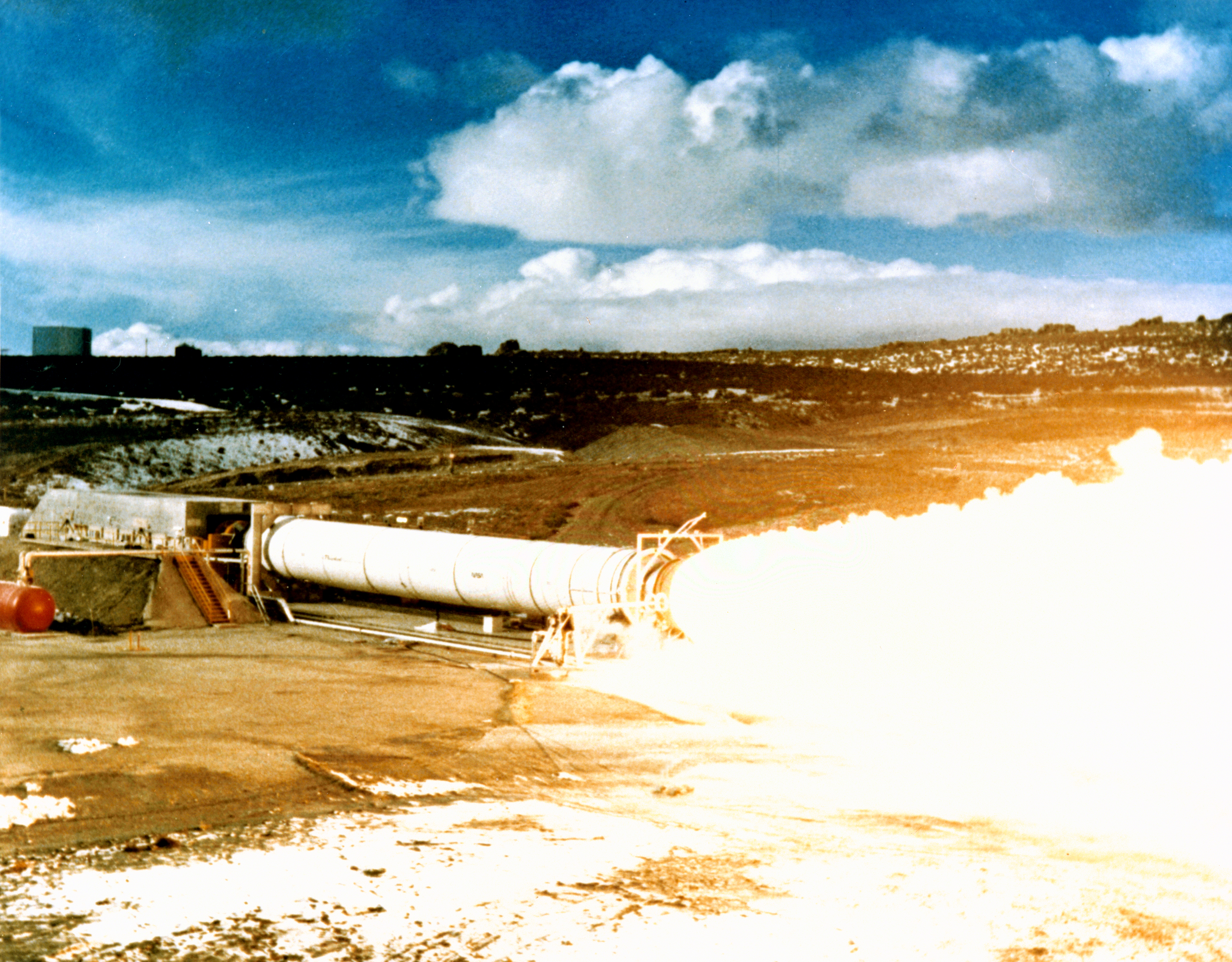
Static test firing, 1978.

Each SRB had two hydraulic gimbal servoactuators, to move the nozzle up/down and side-to-side. This provided thrust vectoring to help control the vehicle in all three axes (roll, pitch, and yaw).

The ascent thrust vector control portion of the flight control system directed the thrust of the three shuttle main engines and the two SRB nozzles to control shuttle attitude and trajectory during lift-off and ascent. Commands from the guidance system were transmitted to the Ascent Thrust Vector Control (ATVC) drivers, which transmitted signals proportional to the commands to each servoactuator of the main engines and SRBs. Four independent flight control system channels and four ATVC channels controlled six main engine and four SRB ATVC drivers, with each driver controlling one hydraulic port on each main and SRB servoactuator.

Each SRB servoactuator consisted of four independent, two-stage servovalves that received signals from the drivers. Each servovalve controlled one power spool in each actuator, which positioned an actuator ram and the nozzle to control the direction of thrust.

The four servovalves operating each actuator provided a force-summed majority-voting arrangement to position the power spool. With four identical commands to the four servovalves, the actuator force-sum action prevented, instantaneously, a single erroneous input affecting power ram motion. If differential-pressure sensing detected the erroneous input persisting over a predetermined time, an isolating valve would be selected, excluding it from the force-sum entirely. Failure monitors were provided for each channel to indicate which channel had been bypassed, and the isolation valve on each channel could be reset.

Each actuator ram was equipped with transducers for position feedback to the thrust vector control system. Within each servoactuator ram was a splashdown load relief assembly to cushion the nozzle at water splashdown and prevent damage to the nozzle flexible bearing.

=== Rate gyro assemblies ===
Each SRB contained three rate gyro assemblies (RGAs), with each RGA containing one pitch and one yaw gyro. These provided an output proportional to angular rates about the pitch and yaw axes to the orbiter computers and guidance, navigation and control system during first-stage ascent flight in conjunction with the orbiter roll rate gyros until SRB separation. At SRB separation, a switchover was made from the SRB RGAs to the orbiter RGAs.

The SRB RGA rates passed through the orbiter flight aft multiplexers/demultiplexers to the orbiter GPCs. The RGA rates were then mid-value-selected in redundancy management to provide SRB pitch and yaw rates to the user software. The RGAs were designed for 20 missions.

=== Segment cases ===
Made out of 2-cm-thick D6AC high-strength low-alloy steel.

=== Propellant ===
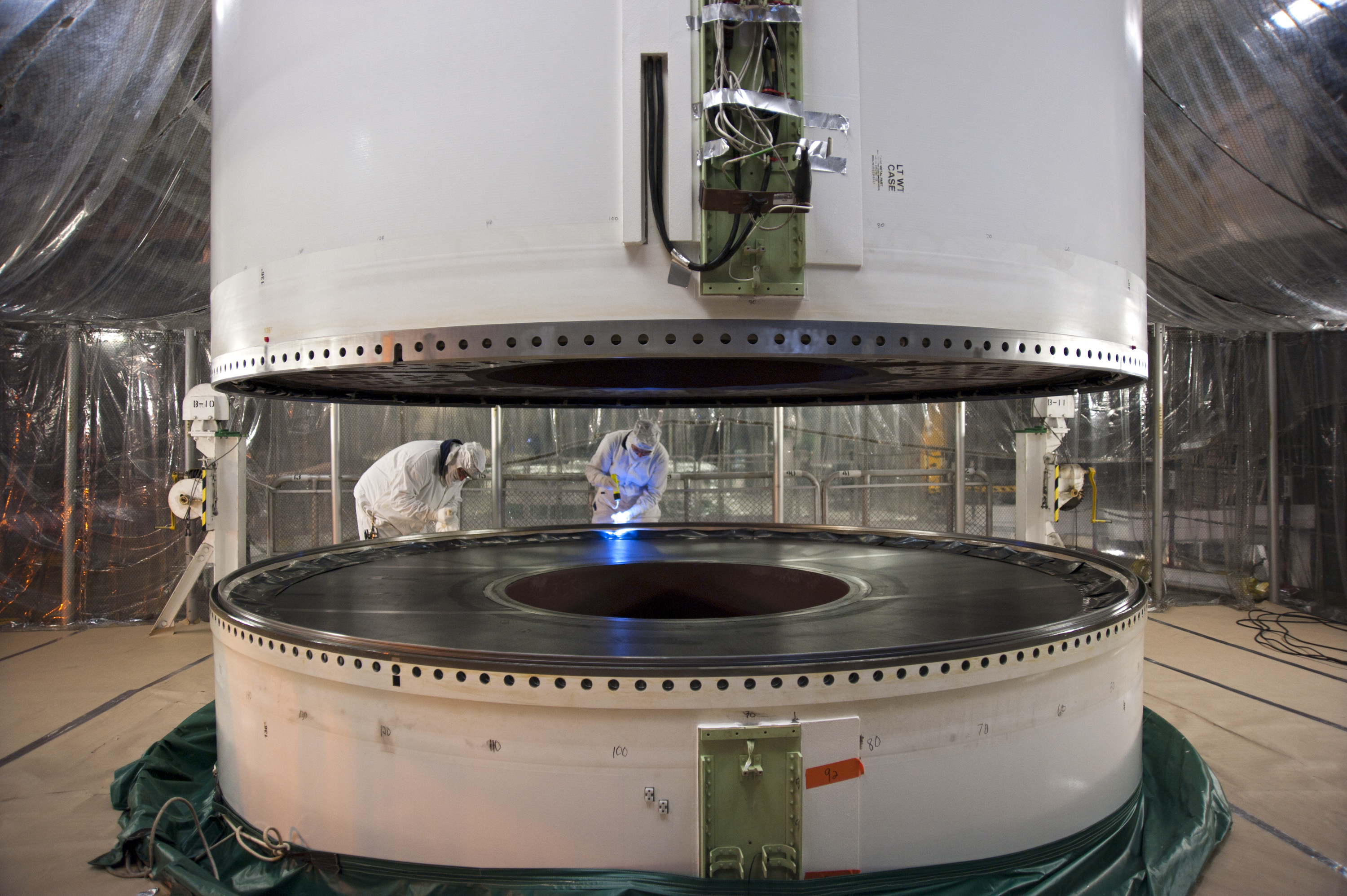
Sections of the SRB filled with propellant being connected for the STS-134 mission

The rocket propellant mixture in each solid rocket motor consisted of ammonium perchlorate (oxidizer, 69.8% by weight), atomized aluminum powder (fuel, 16%), iron oxide (catalyst, 0.2%), PBAN (binder, also acts as fuel, 12.04%), and an epoxy curing agent (1.96%). This propellant is commonly referred to as ammonium perchlorate composite propellant (APCP). This mixture gave the solid rocket motors a specific impulse of 242 seconds (2.37 km/s) at sea level or 268 seconds (2.63 km/s) in a vacuum. Upon ignition, the motor burned the fuel at a nominal chamber pressure of 906.8 psi (6.252 MPa).

Aluminum was chosen as a propellant due to high volumetric energy density, and its resilience to accidental ignition. Aluminum has a specific energy density of about 31.0 MJ/kg.

The propellant had an 11-pointed star-shaped perforation in the forward motor segment and a double-truncated-cone perforation in each of the aft segments and aft closure. This configuration provided high thrust at ignition and then reduced the thrust by approximately a third 50 seconds after lift-off to avoid overstressing the vehicle during maximum dynamic pressure (max. Q).

== Function ==
SRB sea-level thrust, data from STS-107

=== Ignition ===
SRB ignition can occur only when a manual lock pin from each SRB safe and arm device has been removed. The ground crew removes the pin during prelaunch activities. At T−5:00, the SRB safe and arm device is rotated to the arm position. The solid rocket motor ignition commands are issued when the three Space Shuttle Main Engines (SSMEs) are at or above 90% of rated thrust, no SSME fail and/or SRB ignition Pyrotechnic Initiator Controller (PIC) low voltage is indicated and there are no holds from the Launch Processing System (LPS).

The solid rocket motor ignition commands are sent by the orbiter computers through the Master Events Controllers (MECs) to the safe and arm device NASA standard detonators (NSDs) in each SRB. A PIC single-channel capacitor discharge device controls the firing of each pyrotechnic device. Three signals must be present simultaneously for the PIC to generate the pyro firing output. These signals, arm, fire 1 and fire 2, originate in the orbiter general-purpose computers (GPCs) and are transmitted to the MECs. The MECs reformat them to 28 volt DC signals for the PICs. The arm signal charges the PIC capacitor to 40 volts DC (minimum of 20 volts DC).

The GPC launch sequence also controls certain critical main propulsion system valves and monitors the engine ready indications from the SSMEs. The MPS start commands are issued by the onboard computers at T−6.6 seconds (staggered start engine three, engine two, engine one all approximately within 0.25 of a second), and the sequence monitors the thrust buildup of each engine. All three SSMEs must reach the required 90% thrust within three seconds; otherwise, an orderly shutdown is commanded and safing functions are initiated.

Normal thrust buildup to the required 90% thrust level will result in the SSMEs being commanded to the lift off position at T−3 seconds as well as the fire 1 command being issued to arm the SRBs. At T−3 seconds, the vehicle base bending load modes are allowed to initialize (referred to as the "twang", movement of approximately 25.5 in (650 mm) measured at the tip of the external tank, with movement towards the external tank).

The fire 2 commands cause the redundant NSDs to fire through a thin barrier seal down a flame tunnel. This ignites a pyro. booster charge, which is retained in the safe and arm device behind a perforated plate. The booster charge ignites the propellant in the igniter initiator; and combustion products of this propellant ignite the solid rocket motor initiator, which fires down the entire vertical length of the solid rocket motor igniting the solid rocket motor propellant along its entire surface area instantaneously.

At T−0, the two SRBs are ignited, under command of the four onboard computers; separation of the four explosive bolts on each SRB is initiated; the two T-0 umbilicals (one on each side of the spacecraft) are retracted; the onboard master timing unit, event timer and mission event timers are started; the three SSMEs are at 100%; and the ground launch sequence is terminated.

=== Lift-off and ascent ===
Early ignition and lift-off view of main-engines and SRB (ground-camera view)

Timing sequence referencing in ignition is critical for a successful liftoff and ascent flight. The explosive hold-down bolts relieve (through the launch support pedestals and pad structure) the asymmetric vehicle dynamic loads caused by the SSME ignition and thrust buildup, and applied thrust bearing loads. Without the hold-down bolts the SSMEs would violently tip the flight stack (orbiter, external tank, SRBs) over onto the external tank. That rotating moment is initially countered by the hold-bolts. Prior to release of the vehicle stack for liftoff, the SRBs must simultaneously ignite and pressurize their combustion chambers and exhaust nozzles to produce a thrust-derived, net counter-rotating moment exactly equal to the SSME's rotating moment. With the SRBs reaching full thrust, the hold-down bolts are blown, releasing the vehicle stack, the net rotating moment is zero, and the net vehicle thrust (opposing gravity) is positive, lifting the orbiter stack vertically from the launch pedestal, controllable through the coordinated gimbal movements of the SSMEs and the SRB exhaust nozzles.

During ascent, multiple all-axis accelerometers detect and report the vehicle's flight and orientation (referencing the flight deck aboard the orbiter), as the flight reference computers translate navigation commands (steering to a particular waypoint in space, and at a particular time) into engine and motor nozzle gimbal commands, which orient the vehicle about its center of mass. As the forces on the vehicle change due to propellant consumption, increasing speed, changes in aerodynamic drag, and other factors, the vehicle automatically adjusts its orientation in response to its dynamic control command inputs.

=== Separation ===
On-board camera-view of SRB separation.

The SRBs are jettisoned from the space shuttle at an altitude of about 146,000 ft (45 km). SRB separation is initiated when the three solid-rocket motor-chamber pressure transducers are processed in the redundancy-management middle-value select and the head-end chamber pressure of both SRBs is less than or equal to 50 psi (340 kPa). A backup cue is the time elapsed from booster ignition. The separation sequence is initiated, commanding the thrust vector control actuators to the null position and putting the main propulsion system into a second-stage configuration (0.8 seconds from sequence initialization), which ensures the thrust of each SRB is less than 100,000 lbf (440 kN). Orbiter yaw attitude is held for four seconds, and SRB thrust drops to less than 60,000 lbf (270 kN).

The SRBs separate from the external tank within 30 milliseconds of the ordnance firing command. The forward attachment point consists of a ball (SRB) and socket (External Tank; ET) held together by one bolt. The bolt contains one NSD pressure cartridge at each end. The forward attachment point also carries the range safety system cross-strap wiring connecting each SRB Range Safety System (RSS) and the ET RSS with each other. The aft attachment points consist of three separate struts: upper, diagonal and lower. Each strut contains one bolt with an NSD pressure cartridge at each end. The upper strut also carries the umbilical interface between its SRB and the external tank and on to the orbiter.

There are four booster separation motors (BSMs) on each end of each SRB. The BSMs separate the SRBs from the external tank. The solid rocket motors in each cluster of four are ignited by firing redundant NSD pressure cartridges into redundant confined detonating fuse manifolds. The separation commands issued from the orbiter by the SRB separation sequence initiate the redundant NSD pressure cartridge in each bolt and ignite the BSMs to effect a clean separation.

=== Range safety system ===
Loss of Challenger and subsequent self-destruction of the SRB via RSS radio command; the first and only time ever activated in a NASA-controlled human space-launch.

A range safety system (RSS) provides for destruction of a rocket or part of it with on-board explosives by remote command if the rocket is out of control, in order to limit the danger to people on the ground from crashing pieces, explosions, fire, poisonous substances, etc. The RSS was only activated once – during the Space Shuttle Challenger disaster (37 seconds after the breakup of the vehicle, when the SRBs were in uncontrolled flight).

The shuttle vehicle had two RSS, one in each SRB. Both were capable of receiving two command messages (arm and fire) transmitted from the ground station. The RSS was used only when the shuttle vehicle violates a launch trajectory red line.

An RSS consists of two antenna couplers, command receivers/decoders, a dual distributor, a safe and arm device with two NASA standard detonators (NSD), two confined detonating fuse manifolds (CDF), seven CDF assemblies and one linear-shaped charge (LSC).

The antenna couplers provide the proper impedance for radio frequency and ground support equipment commands. The command receivers are tuned to RSS command frequencies and provide the input signal to the distributors when an RSS command is sent. The command decoders use a code plug to prevent any command signal other than the proper command signal from getting into the distributors. The distributors contain the logic to supply valid destruct commands to the RSS pyrotechnics.

The NSDs provide the spark to ignite the CDF, which in turn ignites the LSC for booster destruction. The safe and arm device provides mechanical isolation between the NSDs and the CDF before launch and during the SRB separation sequence.

The first message, called arm, allows the onboard logic to enable a destruct and illuminates a light on the flight deck display and control panel at the commander and pilot station. The second message transmitted is the fire command.

The SRB distributors in the SRBs are cross-strapped together. Thus, if one SRB received an arm or destruct signal, the signal would also be sent to the other SRB.

Electrical power from the RSS battery in each SRB is routed to RSS system A. The recovery battery in each SRB is used to power RSS system B as well as the recovery system in the SRB. The SRB RSS is powered down during the separation sequence, and the SRB recovery system is powered up.

=== Descent and recovery ===
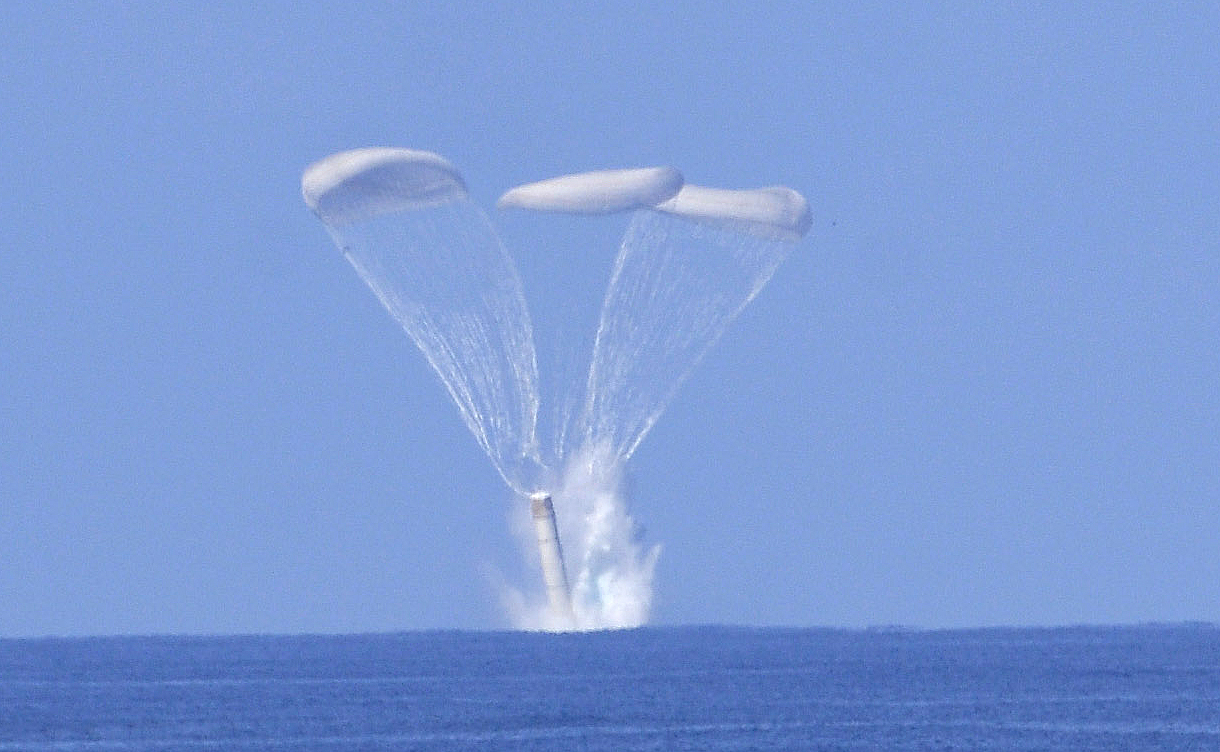
Splashdown of the right hand SRB from the launch of STS-124.

The SRBs are jettisoned from the shuttle system at 2 minutes and an altitude of about 146,000 feet (45 km). After continuing to rise to about 220,000 feet (67 km), the SRBs begin to fall back to earth and once back in the denser atmosphere are slowed by a parachute system to prevent damage on ocean impact. A command is sent from the orbiter to the SRB just before separation to apply battery power to the recovery logic network. A second, simultaneous command arms the three nose cap thrusters (for deploying the pilot and drogue parachute), the frustum ring detonator (for main parachute deployment), and the main parachute disconnect ordnance.

The recovery sequence begins with the operation of the high-altitude baroswitch, which triggers the pyrotechnic nose cap thrusters. This ejects the nose cap, which deploys the pilot parachute. Nose cap separation occurs at a nominal altitude of 15,704 ft (4,787 m), about 218 seconds after SRB separation. The 11.5 ft (3.5 m) diameter conical ribbon pilot parachute provides the force to pull lanyards attached to cut knives, which cut the loop securing the drogue retention straps. This allows the pilot chute to pull the drogue pack from the SRB, causing the drogue suspension lines to deploy from their stored position. At full extension of the twelve 105 ft (32 m) suspension lines, the drogue deployment bag is stripped away from the canopy, and the 54 ft (16 m) diameter conical ribbon drogue parachute inflates to its initial reefed condition. The drogue disreefs twice after specified time delays (using redundant 7- and 12-second reefing line cutters), and it reorients/stabilizes the SRB for main chute deployment. The drogue parachute has a design load of approximately 315,000 lb (143 t) and weighs approximately 1,200 lb (540 kg).

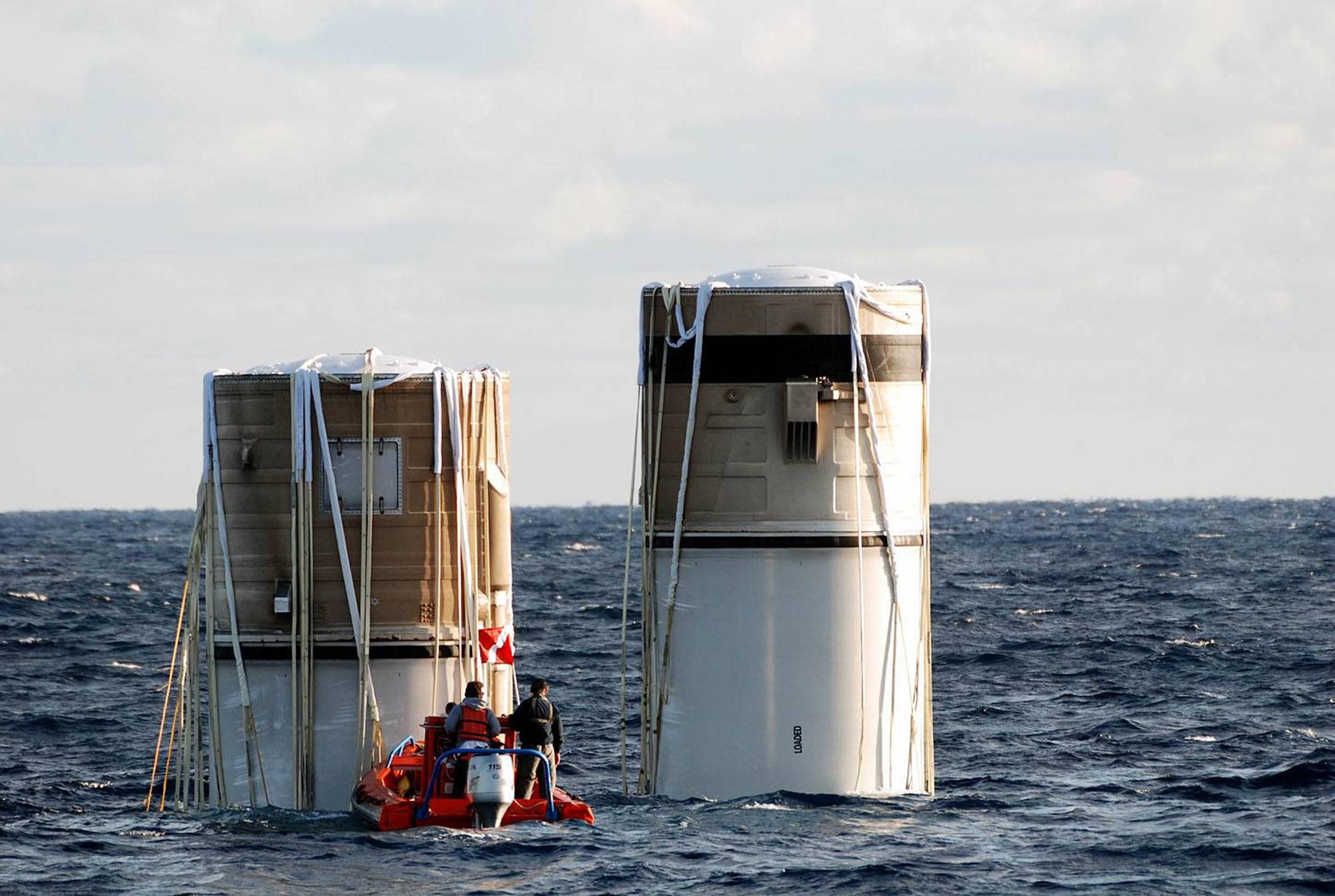
The solid rocket boosters, jettisoned from the Space Shuttle Discovery following the launch of STS-116, floating in the Atlantic Ocean about 150 miles northeast of Cape Canaveral. On this occasion, the boosters landed several miles apart, but overnight winds and currents drifted them to the same location

After the drogue chute has stabilized the SRB in a tail-first attitude, the frustum is separated from the forward skirt by a pyrotechnic charge triggered by the low-altitude baroswitch at a nominal altitude of 5,500 ft (1,700 m) about 243 seconds after SRB separation. The frustum is then pulled away from the SRB by the drogue chute. The main chute suspension lines are pulled out from deployment bags that remain in the frustum. At full extension of the lines, which are 203 ft (62 m) long, the three main chutes are pulled from their deployment bags and inflate to their first reefed condition. The frustum and drogue parachute continue on a separate trajectory to splashdown. After specified time delays (using redundant 10- and 17-second reefing line cutters), the main chute reefing lines are cut and the chutes inflate to their second reefed and full open configurations. The main chute cluster decelerates the SRB to terminal conditions. Each of the 136 ft (41 m) diameter, 20° conical ribbon parachutes have a design load of approximately 195,000 lb (88 t) and each weighs approximately 2,180 lb (990 kg). These parachutes are the largest that have ever been used, in both deployed size and load weight. The RSRM nozzle extension is severed by a pyrotechnic charge about 20 seconds after frustum separation.

Water impact occurs about 279 seconds after SRB separation at a nominal velocity of 76 feet per second (23 m/s). The water impact range is approximately 130 nmi (240 km) off the eastern coast of Florida. Because the parachutes provide for a nozzle-first impact, air is trapped in the empty (burned out) motor casing, causing the booster to float with the forward end approximately 30 feet (9 m) out of the water.

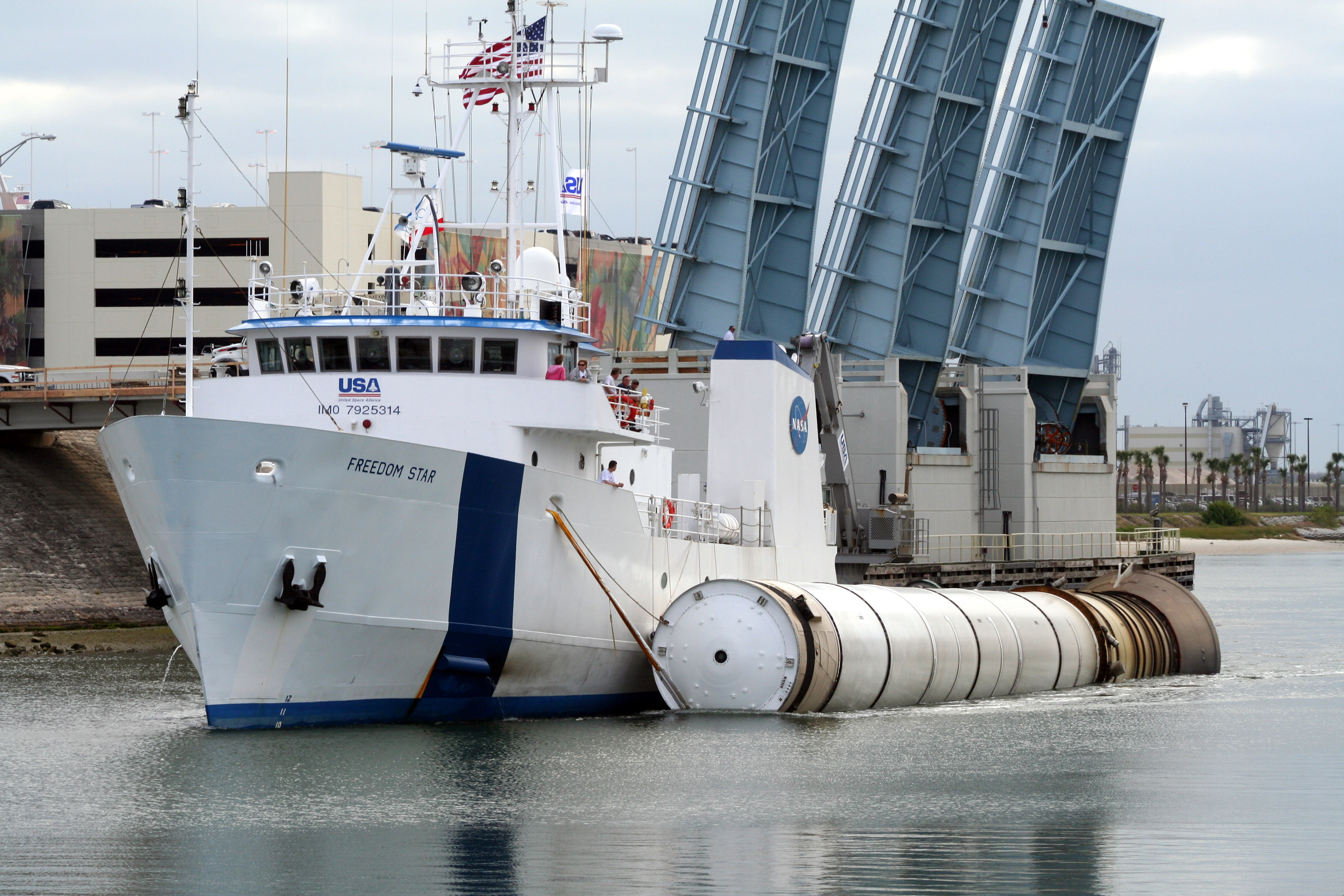
Solid rocket booster of the STS-131 mission being recovered and transported to Cape Canaveral by the MV Freedom Star.

Formerly, the main chutes were released from the SRB at impact using a parachute release nut ordnance system (residual loads in the main chutes would deploy the parachute attach fittings with floats tethered to each fitting). The current design keeps the main chutes attached during water impact (initial impact and slapdown). Salt Water Activated Release (SWAR) devices are now incorporated into the main chute riser lines to simplify recovery efforts and reduce damage to the SRB. The drogue deployment bag/pilot parachutes, drogue parachutes and frustums, each main chute, and the SRBs are buoyant and are recovered.

Specially fitted NASA recovery ships, the MV Freedom Star and the MV Liberty Star, recover the SRBs and descent/recovery hardware. Once the boosters are located, the Diver Operated Plug (DOP) is maneuvered by divers into place to plug the SRB nozzle and drain the water from the motor case. Pumping air into and water out of the SRB causes the SRB to change from a nose-up floating position to a horizontal attitude more suitable for towing. The retrieval vessels then tow the boosters and other objects recovered back to Kennedy Space Center.

== Challenger disaster ==
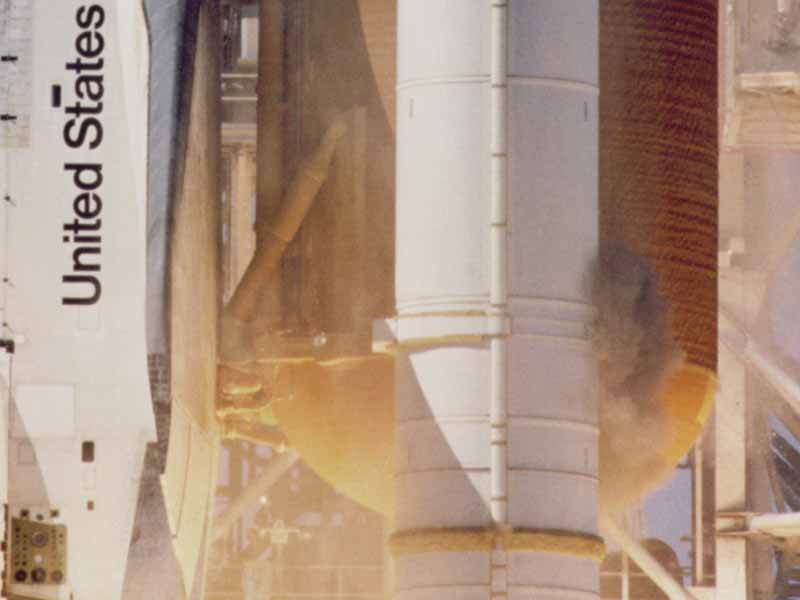
Camera captures grey smoke being emitted from the right-hand SRB on Space Shuttle Challenger just after booster ignition at the start of the ill-fated STS-51-L.

The loss of Space Shuttle Challenger originated with a system failure of one of its SRBs. The cause of the accident was found by the Rogers Commission to be "a faulty design unacceptably sensitive to a number of factors" of the SRB joints compounded by unusually cold weather the morning of the flight. The field joint design was flawed, with flexure of the joints during launch compromising the seal of the large rubber O-rings and allowing them to extrude further into the joint and erode as hot exhaust gases passed through during past launches. Additionally, the O-rings were not resilient at low temperatures like those of the January 1986 morning of the accident (36 °F; 2.2 °C). A cold-compromised joint in the right SRB failed at launch and allowed hot gases from within that rocket booster to sear a hole into the adjacent main external fuel tank and also weaken the lower strut holding the SRB to the external tank. The leak in the SRB joint caused the eventually catastrophic failure of the lower strut and partial detachment of the SRB, which led to a collision between the SRB and the external tank. With the external tank being destroyed and the shuttle stack, traveling at a speed of Mach 1.92 at 46,000 feet (14 km), thrusted off-axis by the right SRB as well as the tank's collapse, Challenger disintegrated. Both SRBs survived the accident initially, until they were destroyed by the range safety officer. Prior to the disaster, a teleconference was held between Marshall Spaceflight Center, Kennedy Space Center, and Morton Thiokol to discuss the upcoming launch. Originally, Morton Thiokol held the stance that the launch temperatures were too cold for launch. However, after a period of recess, Morton Thiokol had changed their stance, and was no longer opposed to launch.

The right SRB shows an anomalous plume at T+58.788 seconds recorded via NASA chase-camera E-207. O-Ring sealant failure resulting in visible SRB thrust gas impinging against, penetrating, and then detonating the LH2 reservoir of the ET.

Diagram of Space Shuttle Challenger and solid rocket booster, showing location of the O-ring that failed during launch.

During the subsequent downtime, detailed structural analyses were performed on critical structural elements of the SRB. Analyses were primarily focused on areas where anomalies had been noted during postflight inspection of recovered hardware.

One of the areas was the attachment ring where the SRBs are connected to the external tank. Areas of distress were noted in some of the fasteners where the ring attaches to the SRB motor case. This situation was attributed to the high loads encountered during water impact. To correct the situation and ensure higher strength margins during ascent, the attach ring was redesigned to encircle the motor case completely (360°). Previously, the attachment ring formed a 'C' shape and encircled the motor case just 270°. Additionally, special structural tests were performed on the aft skirt. During this test program, an anomaly occurred in a critical weld between the hold-down post and skin of the skirt. A redesign was implemented to add reinforcement brackets and fittings in the aft ring of the skirt.

These two modifications added approximately 450 lb (200 kg) to the weight of each SRB. The result is called a Redesigned Solid Rocket Motor (RSRM).

== Construction and delivery ==
The prime contractor for the manufacture of the SRB motor segments was ATK Launch Systems (formerly Morton Thiokol Inc.) Wasatch Division based in Magna, Utah.

United Space Boosters Inc. (USBI), a division of Pratt & Whitney, under United Technologies, was the original SRB prime contractor for SRB assembly, checkout and refurbishment for all non-solid-rocket-motor components and for SRB integration. They were the longest-running prime contractor for the Space Shuttle that was part of the original launch team. USBI was absorbed by United Space Alliance as the Solid Rocket Booster Element division in 1998 and the USBI division was disbanded at Pratt & Whitney the following year. At its peak, USBI had over 1500 personnel working on the Shuttle Boosters at KSC, FL and Huntsville, Alabama.

Components of the SRBs were transported from Utah to the Kennedy Space Center in Florida via rail over twelve days covering 2,000 miles (3,200 km) and eight states. Each segment and its custom built rail car weighed approximately 300,000 pounds (140,000 kg). Cars carrying SRBs were separated by empty cars to distribute the load over bridges and trestles, particularly the bridge over the Indian River, the last bridge on the train's journey. Following recovery, spent segments were loaded onto those same train cars and returned to Utah for refurbishment and refueling.

=== Incident ===
On May 2, 2007, a freight train carrying segments of the space shuttle's solid rocket boosters derailed in Myrtlewood, Alabama, after a rail trestle collapsed. The train was carrying eight SRB segments intended for STS-120 and STS-122. Four segments dropped approximately 10 feet (3.0 m). Four other segments along with a car carrying aft exit cones (nozzles), not yet on the trestle, remained on solid ground. The segments that fell from the trestle were recovered and returned to Utah for inspection. After analyses of the forces put on the remaining four segments that had not fallen were found to be well within tolerances, those segments continued on to Florida.

== Upgrade projects not put into service ==
=== Advanced Solid Rocket Motor (ASRM) Project (1988–1993) ===
In 1988–1989, NASA was planning on replacing the post-Challenger SRBs with a new Advanced Solid Rocket Motor (ASRM) to be built by Aerojet at a new facility, designed by subcontractor, RUST International, on the location of a cancelled Tennessee Valley Authority nuclear power plant, at Yellow Creek, Mississippi (Yellow Creek Nuclear Plant).

The ASRM would be slightly wider (the booster's diameter would be increased from 146 inches to 150 inches) and have 200,000 pounds of extra propellant, and have produced additional thrust in order to increase shuttle payload by about 12,000 lb, so that it could carry modules and construction components to the ISS. They were expected to be safer than the post-Challenger SRBs. The initial $1.2 Bn contract was to be for 12 motors, with an option for another 88 at maybe another $1 bn. Morton Thiokol would build the nozzles. The first test flight was expected around 1994.

The ASRM program was cancelled in 1993 after robotic assembly systems and computers were on-site and approximately 2 billion dollars spent, in favor of continued use of the SRB after design flaw corrections.

=== Filament-wound cases ===
In order to provide the necessary performance to launch polar-orbiting shuttles from the SLC-6 launch pad at Vandenberg Air Force Base in California, SRBs using filament-wound cases (FWC) were designed to be more lightweight than the steel cases used on Kennedy Space Center-launched SRBs. Unlike the regular SRBs, which had the flawed field joint design that led to the Challenger Disaster in 1986, the FWC boosters had the "double tang" joint design (necessary to keep the boosters properly in alignment during the "twang" movement when the SSMEs are ignited prior to liftoff), but used the two O-ring seals. With the closure of SLC-6, the FWC boosters were scrapped by ATK and NASA, but their field joints, albeit modified to incorporate the current three O-ring seals and joint heaters, were later (after STS-51L) incorporated into the field joints on the SRBs used until the last flight in 2011.

=== Five-segment booster ===
Prior to the destruction of the Space Shuttle Columbia in 2003, NASA investigated the replacement of the current 4-segment SRBs with either a 5-segment SRB design or replacing them altogether with liquid-fueled "flyback" boosters using either Atlas V or Delta IV EELV technologies. The 5-segment SRB, which would have required little change to the current shuttle infrastructure, would have allowed the space shuttle to carry an additional 20,000 lb (9,100 kg) of payload in an International Space Station-inclination orbit, eliminate the dangerous Return-to-Launch Site (RTLS) and Trans-Oceanic Abort (TAL) modes, and, by using a so-called dog-leg maneuver, fly south-to-north polar orbiting flights from Kennedy Space Center.

The five-segment SRB would use a wider nozzle throat to keep within the pressure limit of the existing segment casings.

After the destruction of Columbia, NASA shelved the five-segment SRB for the Shuttle Program, for safety reasons. One five-segment engineering test motor, ETM-03, was fired on October 23, 2003.

As part of the Constellation Program, the first stage of the Ares I rocket was planned to use five-segment SRBs; in September 2009 a five-segment Space Shuttle SRB (DM-1) was static fired on the ground in ATK's desert testing area in Utah. Additional tests (DM-2 and DM-3) were carried out in Aug 2010 and Sept 2011.

After the Constellation Program was cancelled in 2011, the new Space Launch System (SLS) was designated to use five-segment boosters. The first test of a SRB for SLS (QM-1) was completed in early 2015, a second test (QM-2) was performed in mid 2016 at Orbital ATK's Promontory, Utah facility.

== Displays ==
Space Shuttle Solid Rocket Boosters are on display at the Kennedy Space Center Visitor Complex in Florida, the Stennis Space Center in Hancock County, Mississippi, the United States Space & Rocket Center in Huntsville, Alabama, the March Field Air Museum on March ARB in California, and at Orbital ATK's facility near Promontory, Utah. A partial filament-wound booster case is on display at Pima Air & Space Museum in Tucson, Arizona. Two flight-worthy Solid Rocket Boosters with parts flown in 81 different Space Shuttle missions are in a vertical stack configuration at the California Science Center attached to the last surviving flight-worthy external tank (ET-94) and Space Shuttle Endeavour in Los Angeles, California. The display will be opened to the public in the new Samuel Oschin Air and Space Center on November 13, 2026.

== Current, future and proposed uses ==
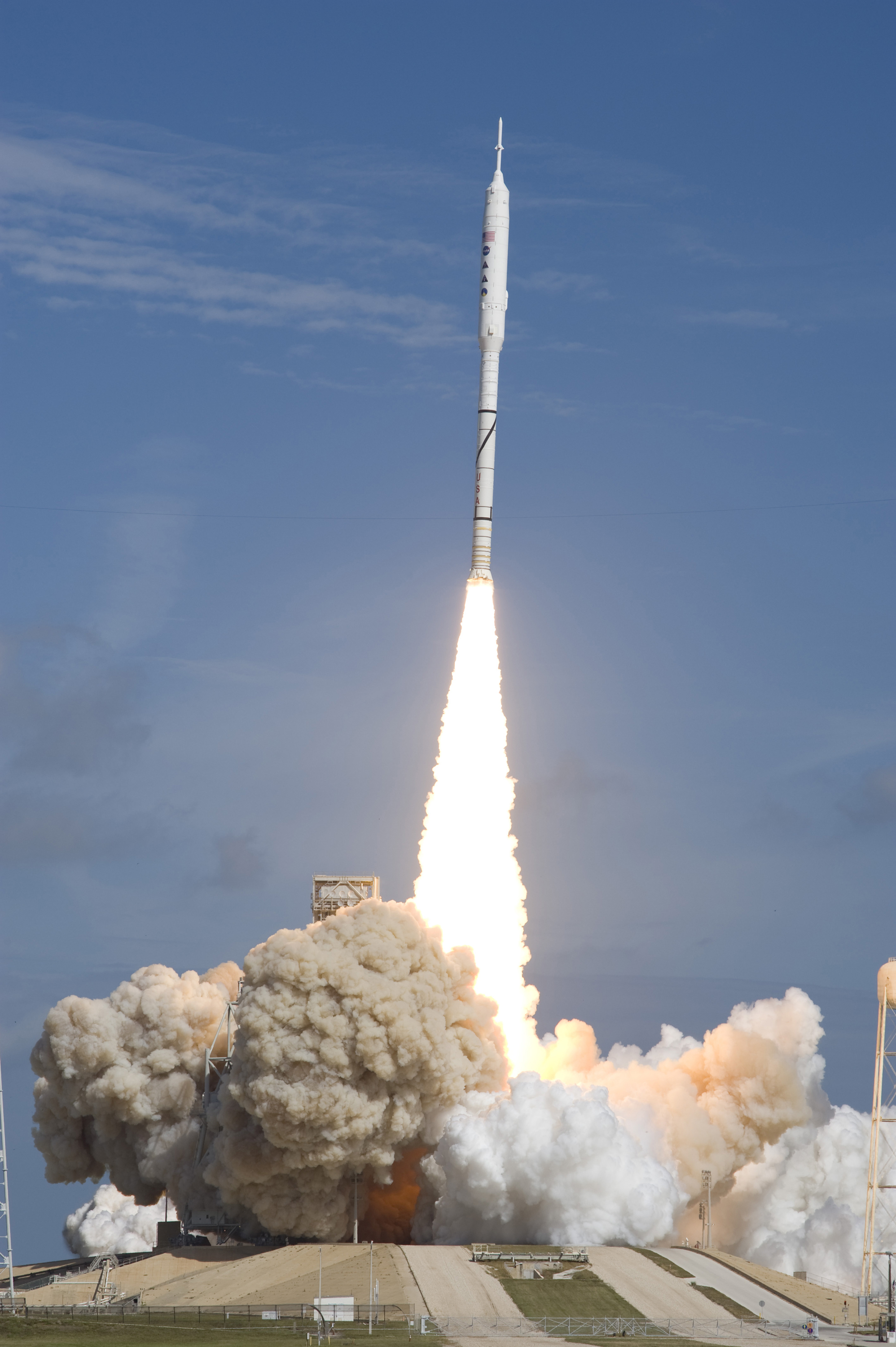
The Ares I-X prototype launches from LC-39B, 15:30 UTC, October 28, 2009 – this was as of October 2022 the sole flight of a launch vehicle derived from the SRB.

Over time several proposals to reuse the SRB design were presented – however, as of 2016 none of these proposals progressed to regular flights before being cancelled. Until the 2022 first test flight of the Space Launch System (SLS), a sole test-flight of the Ares I-X prototype in 2009 was the furthest any of these proposals progressed.

=== Ares ===
NASA initially planned to reuse the four-segment SRB design and infrastructure in several Ares rockets, which would have propelled the Orion spacecraft into orbit. In 2005, NASA announced the Shuttle-Derived Launch Vehicle slated to carry the Orion Crew Exploration Vehicle into low-Earth orbit and later to the Moon. The SRB-derived Crew Launch Vehicle (CLV), named Ares I, was planned to feature a single modified 4-segment SRB for its first stage; a single liquid-fueled modified Space Shuttle Main Engine would have powered the second stage.

The Ares I design updated in 2006 featured one 5-segment SRB (originally developed for the Shuttle, but never used) as a first stage; the second stage was powered by an uprated J-2X engine, derived from the J-2, which had been used in the upper stage of Saturn V and Saturn IB. In place of the standard SRB nosecone, the Ares I would have a tapered interstage assembly connecting the booster proper with the second stage, an attitude control system derived from the Regulus missile system, and larger, heavier parachutes to lower the stage into the Atlantic Ocean for recovery.

Also introduced in 2005, was a heavy-lift Cargo Launch Vehicle (CaLV) named Ares V. Early designs of the Ares V utilized 5 standard-production SSMEs and a pair of 5-segment boosters identical to those proposed for the Shuttle, while later plans redesigned the boosters around the RS-68 rocket engine used on the Delta IV EELV system. Initially, NASA switched over to a system using the 5-segment boosters and a cluster of 5 RS-68s (which resulted in a widening of the Ares V core unit), then NASA reconfigured the vehicle with 6 RS-68B engines, with the boosters themselves becoming 5.5-segment boosters, with an additional half-segment to provide additional thrust at liftoff.

That final redesign would have made the Ares V booster taller and more powerful than the now-retired Saturn V/INT-20, N-1, and Energia rockets, and would have allowed the Ares V to place both the Earth Departure Stage and Altair spacecraft into low-Earth orbit for later on-orbit assembly. Unlike the 5-segment SRB for the Ares I, the 5.5-segment boosters for the Ares V were to be identical in design, construction, and function to the current SRBs except for the extra segments. Like the shuttle boosters, the Ares V boosters would fly an almost-identical flight trajectory from launch to splashdown.

The Constellation program, including Ares I and Ares V, was canceled in October 2010 by the passage of the 2010 NASA authorization bill.

=== DIRECT ===
The DIRECT proposal for a new, Shuttle-Derived Launch Vehicle, unlike the Ares I and Ares V boosters, used a pair of classic 4-segment SRBs with the SSMEs used on the Shuttle.

=== Athena III ===
In 2008, PlanetSpace proposed the Athena III launch vehicle for ISS resupply flights under the COTS program; it would have featured 2 1/2 segments from the original SRB design.

=== Space Launch System (SLS) ===
Space Launch System SRB
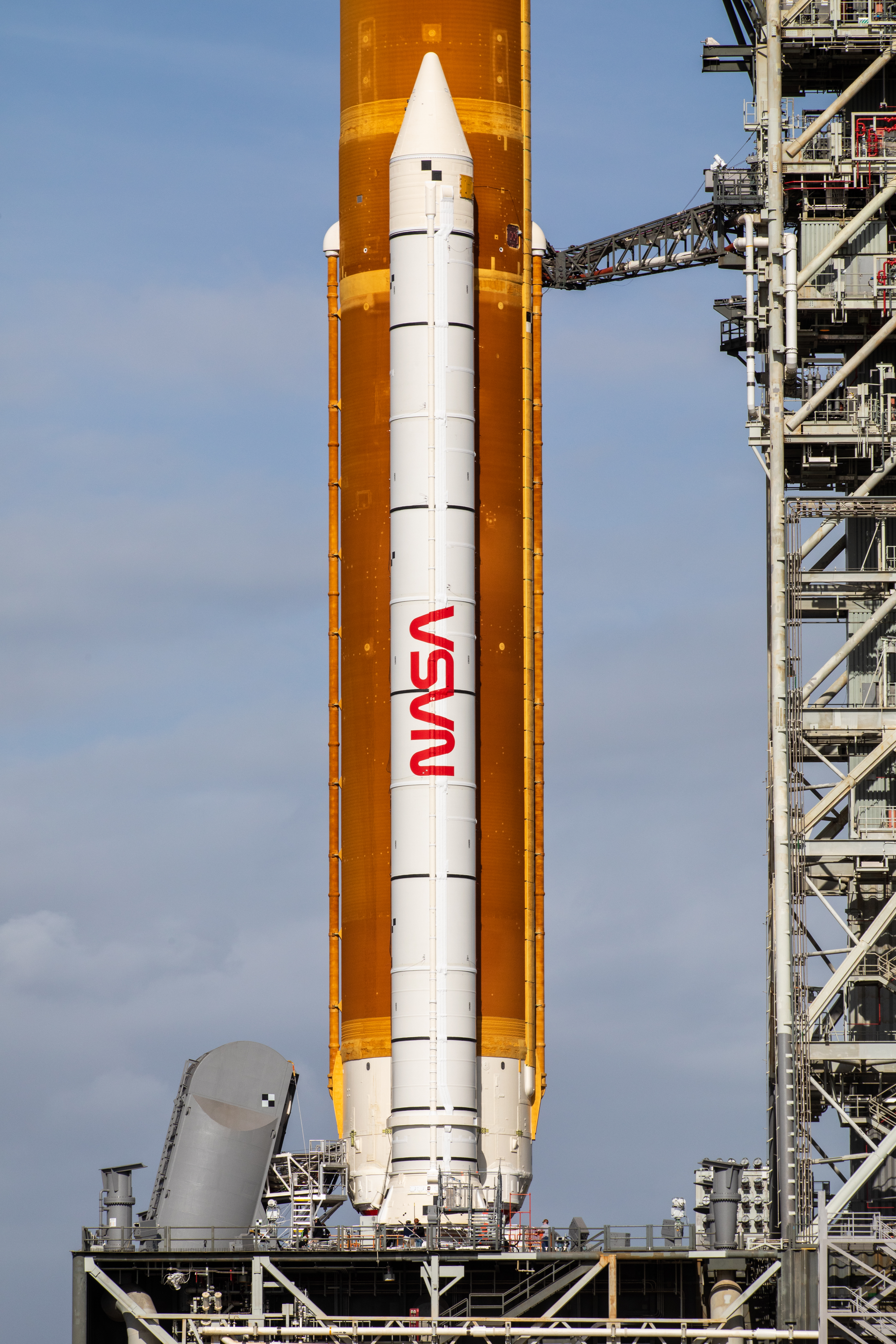
- One of the two SLS Block I SRBs for Artemis I
- Manufacturer: Thiokol, later ATK; United Space Boosters Inc., Pratt & Whitney, Northrop Grumman
- Country of origin: United States
- Used on: Space Launch System

General characteristics
- Height: 177 ft (54 m)
- Diameter: 12.17 ft (3.71 m)
- Gross mass: 1,600,000 lb (730 t)
- Propellant mass: 1,400,000 lb (640 t)
- Empty mass: 200,000 lb (91 t)

5-segment SRB
- Powered by: 1
- Maximum thrust: 3,280,000 lbf (14,600 kN) sea level
- Specific impulse: 268 seconds (2.63 km/s)
- Burn time: 126 s
- Propellant: PBAN-APCP

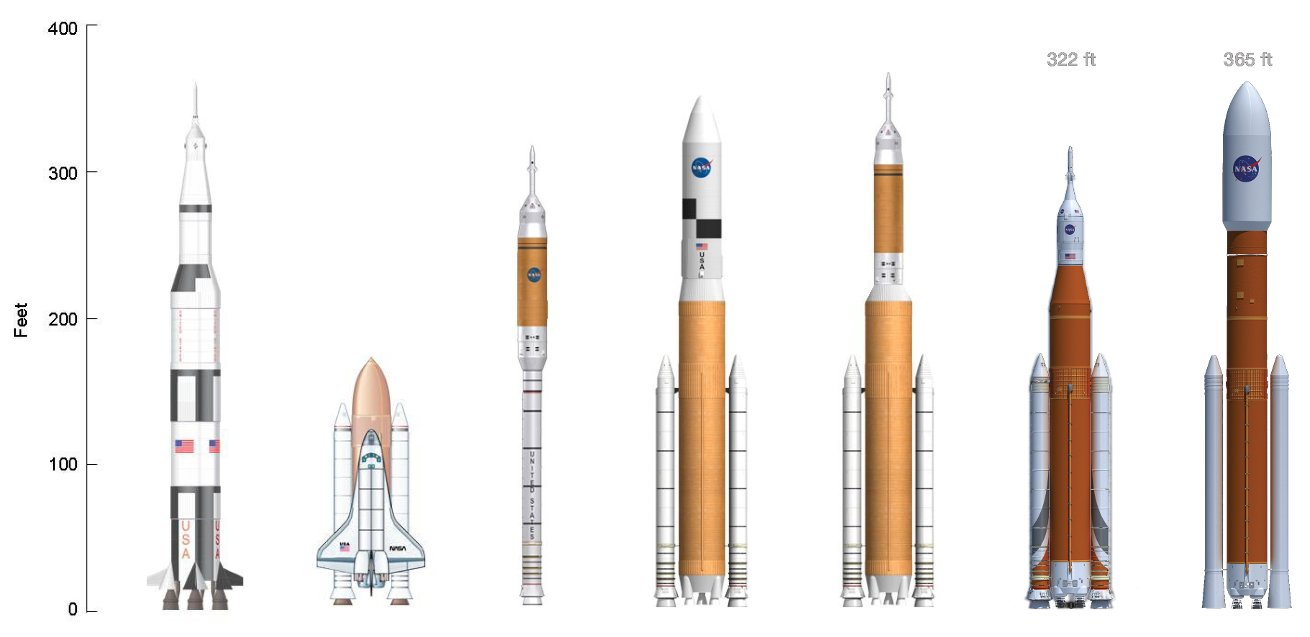
Comparison of the Saturn V, Space Shuttle, Ares I, Ares V, Ares IV, SLS Block I and SLS Block II

The first versions (Blocks 1 and 1B) of the Space Launch System (SLS) use a pair of five-segment Solid Rocket Boosters (SRBs), which were developed from the four-segment SRBs used for the Shuttle. Modifications for the SLS included the addition of a center booster segment, new avionics, and new insulation which eliminates the Shuttle SRB's asbestos and is 860 kg (1,900 lb) lighter. The five-segment SRBs provide approximately 25% more total impulse than the Shuttle SRB, and are not recovered after use.

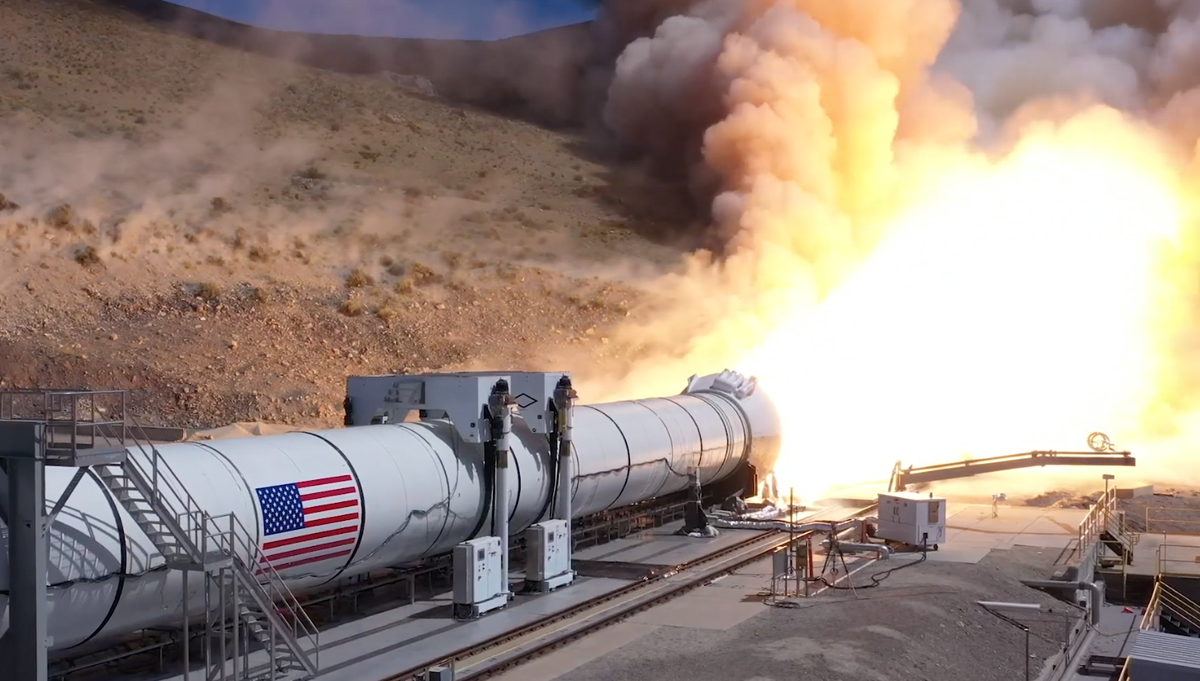
SLS SRB being tested in 2021.

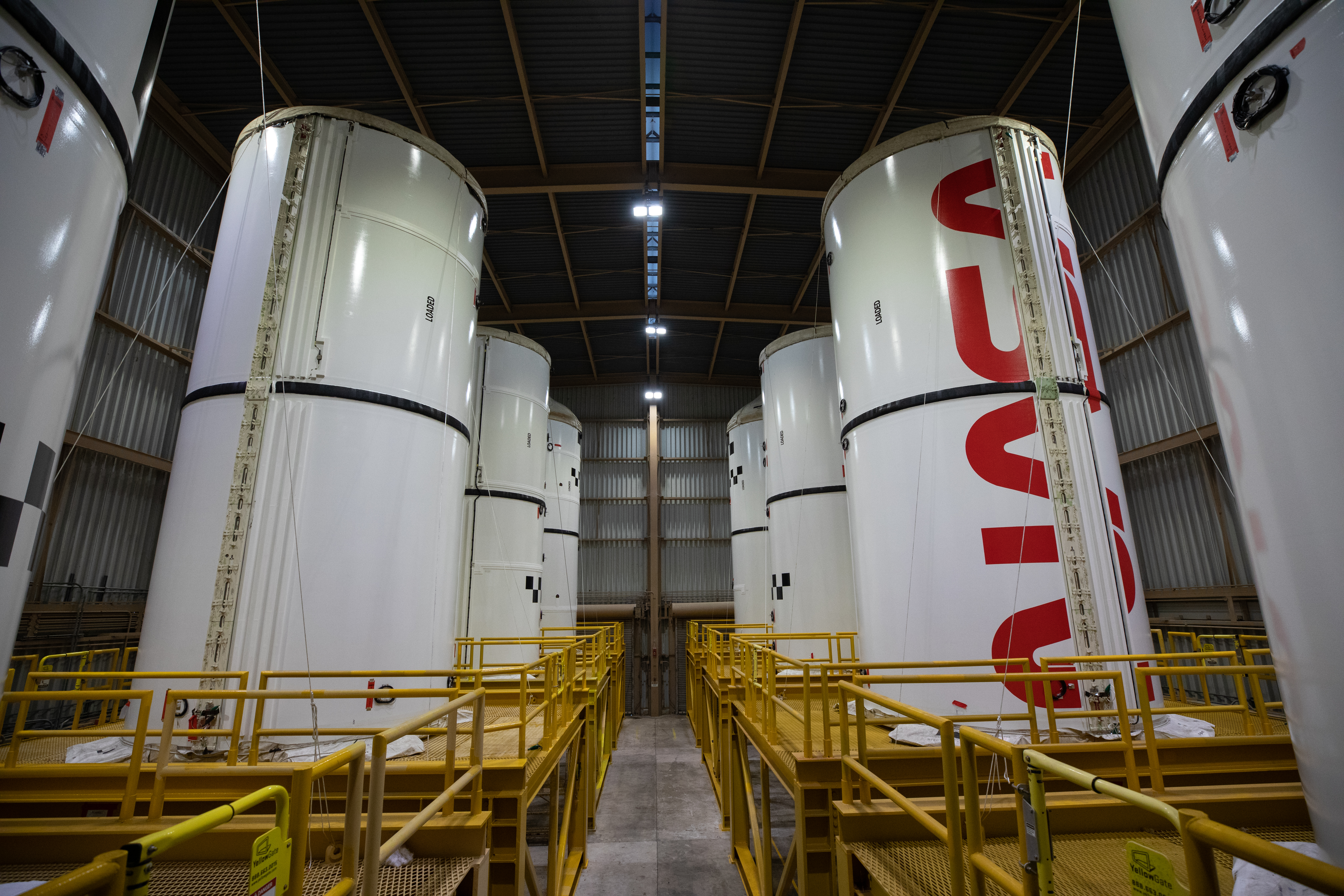
Multiple segments of the SLS SRB at Kennedy Space Center in 2020, waiting for their final assembly.

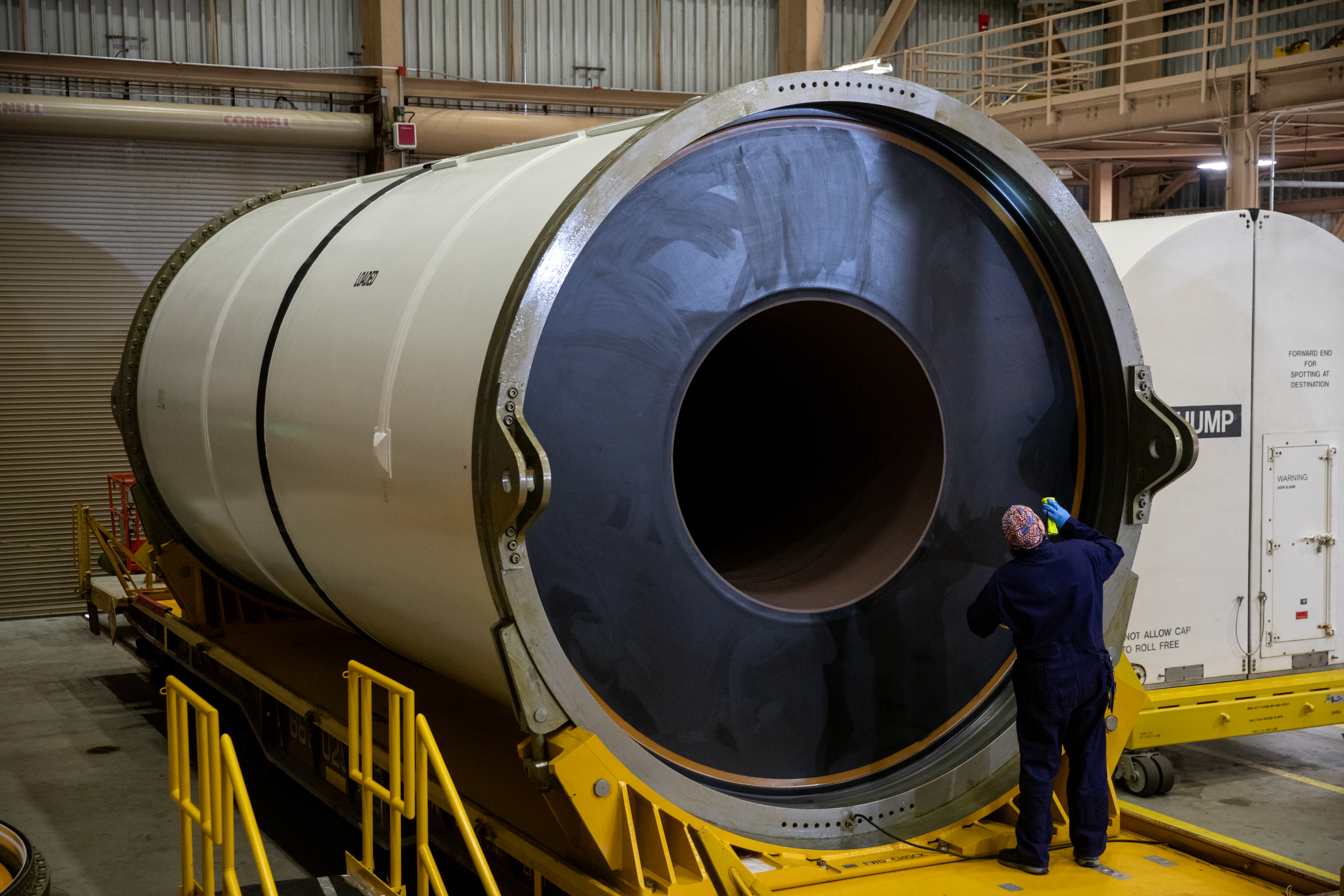
Cross-section of an Artemis II booster segment.

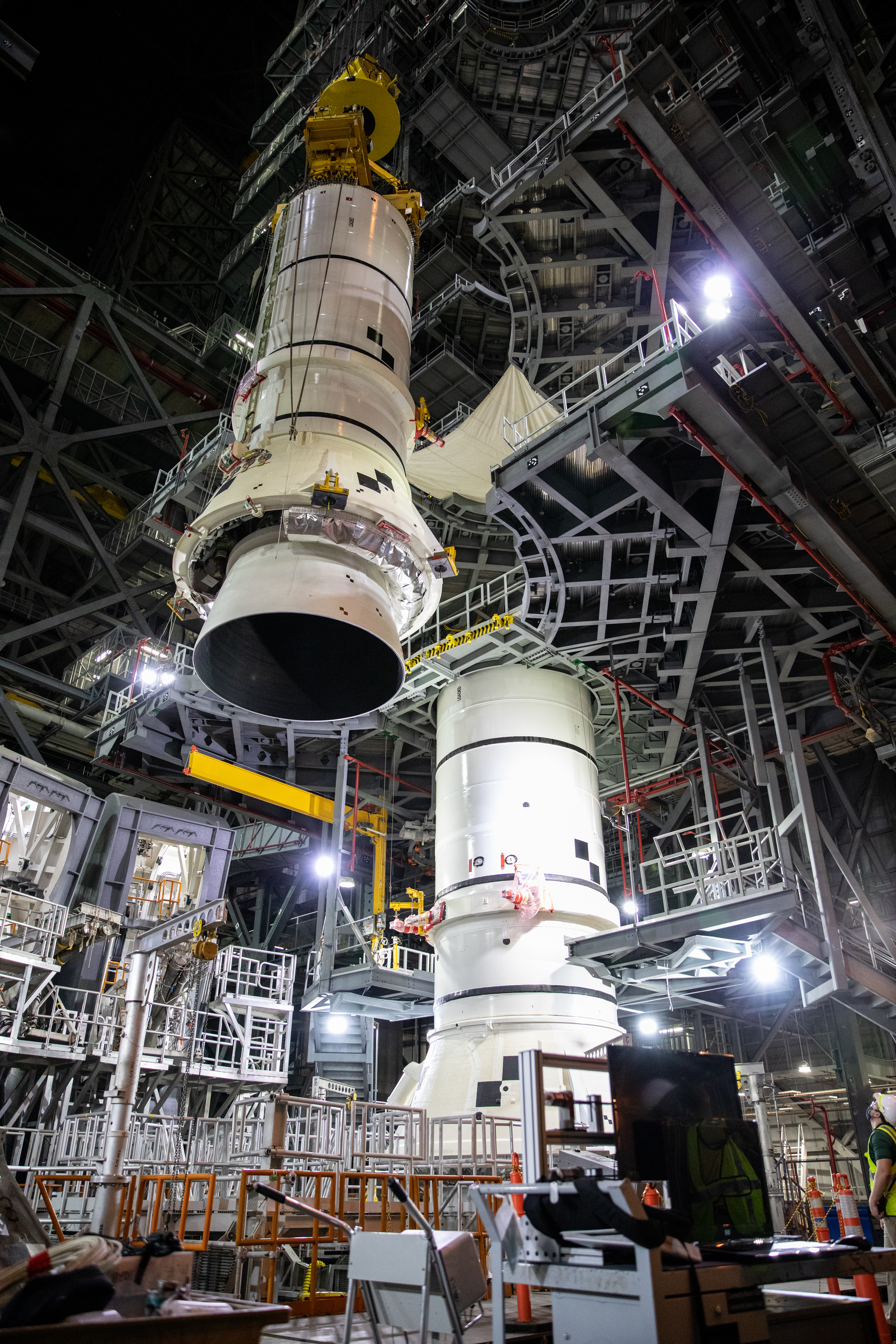
Aft booster segments for Artemis I being stacked at the Vehicle Assembly Building, as seen in 2020.

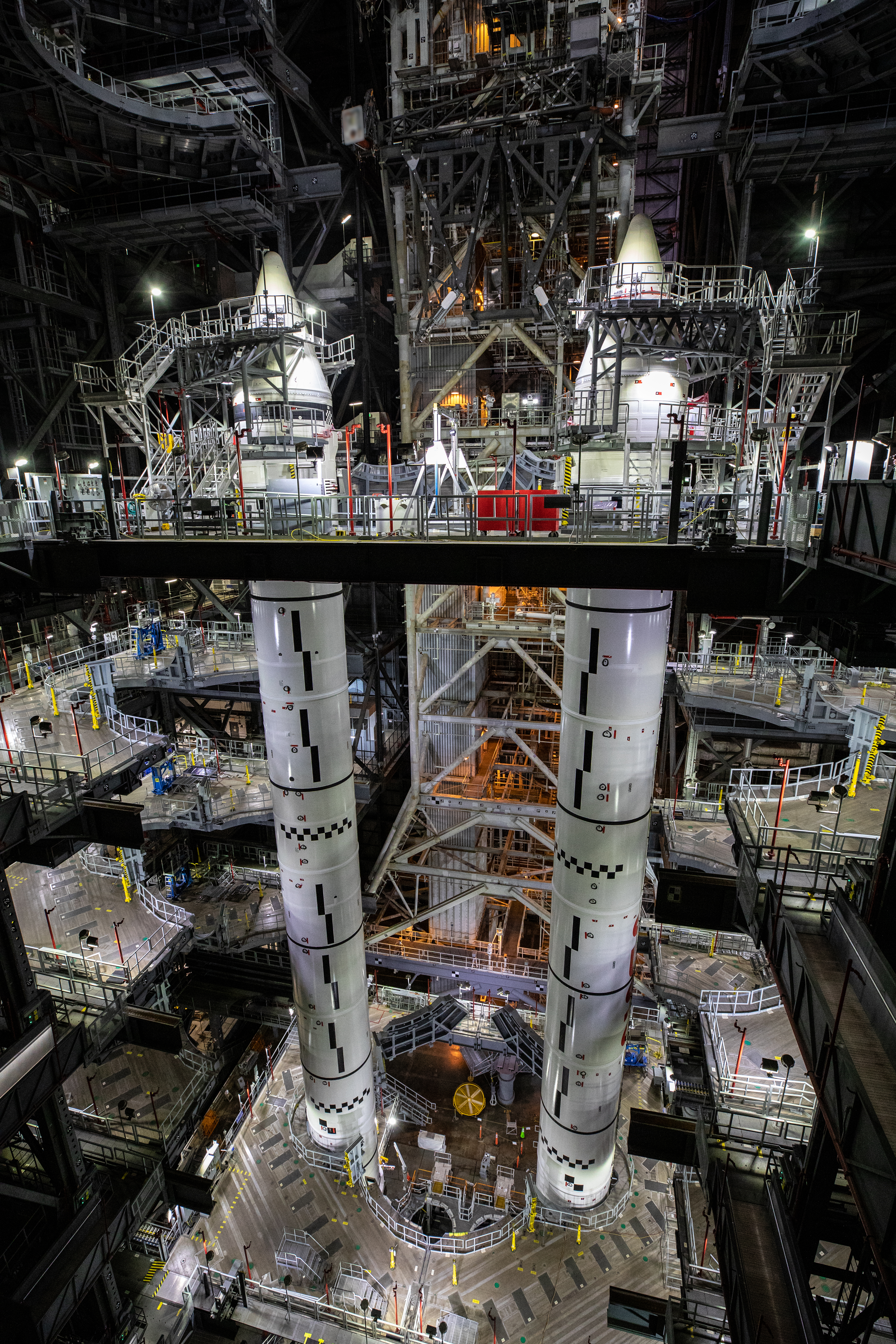
The fully-stacked boosters that would be powering Artemis I, as seen in 2021 at the Vehicle Assembly Building.

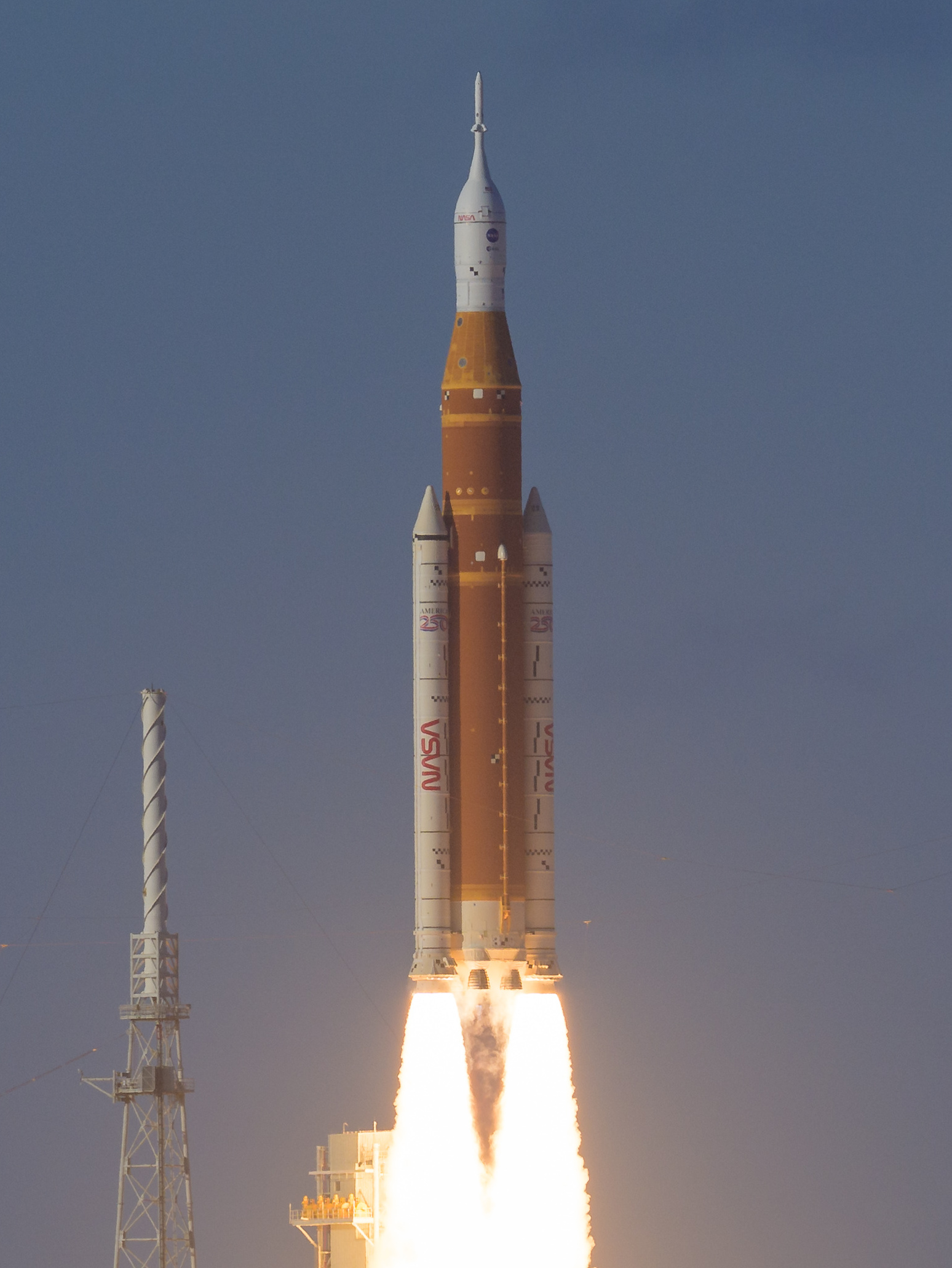
The two boosters being ignited, sending Artemis II into space.

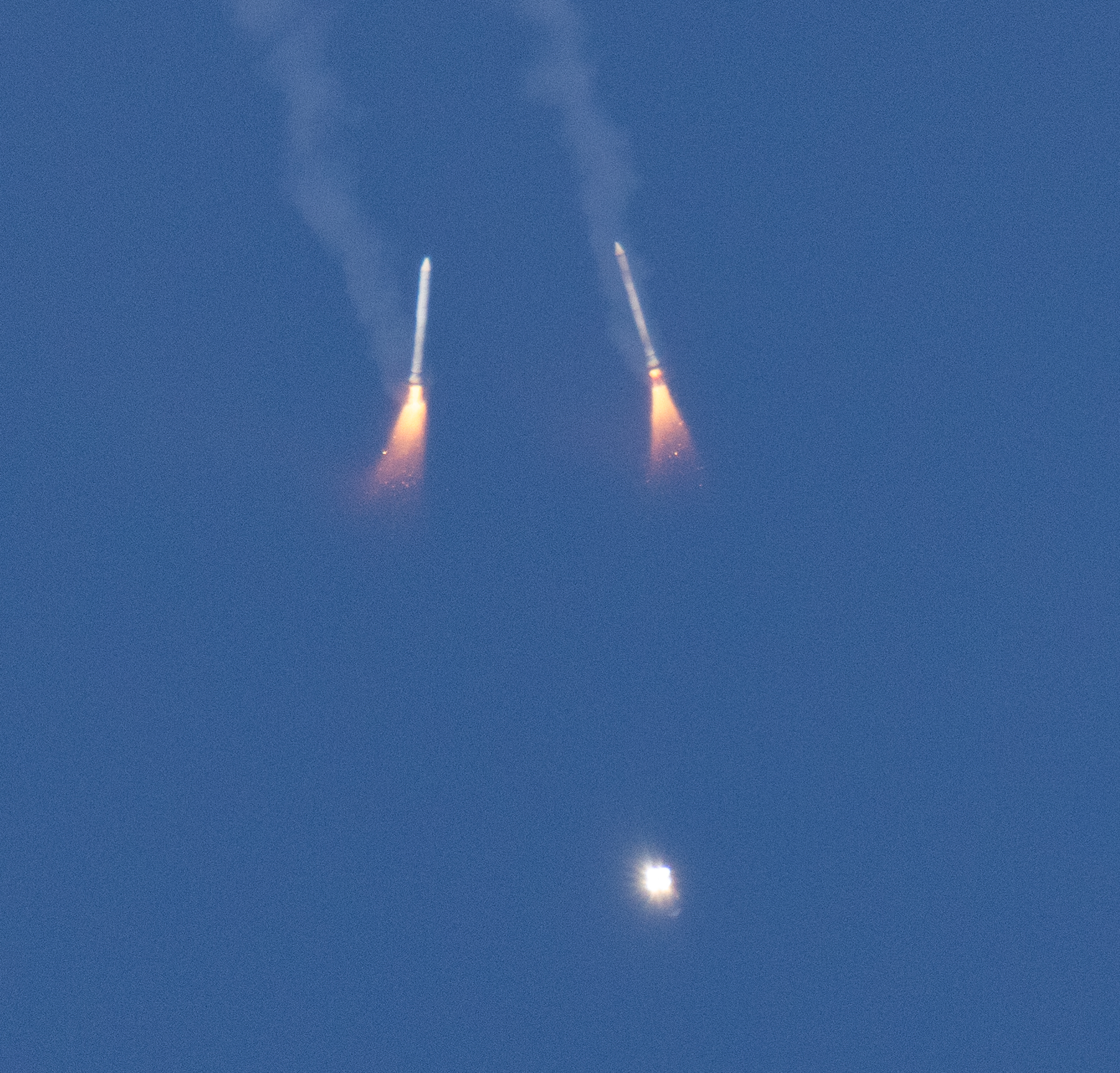
The two booster separating from Artemis II minutes after the launch.

== See also ==
- Solid rocket booster
- PEPCON disaster
- Studied Space Shuttle variations and derivatives
