= Los Ciclones =

Faction of a Mexican drug trafficking organization known as the Gulf Cartel

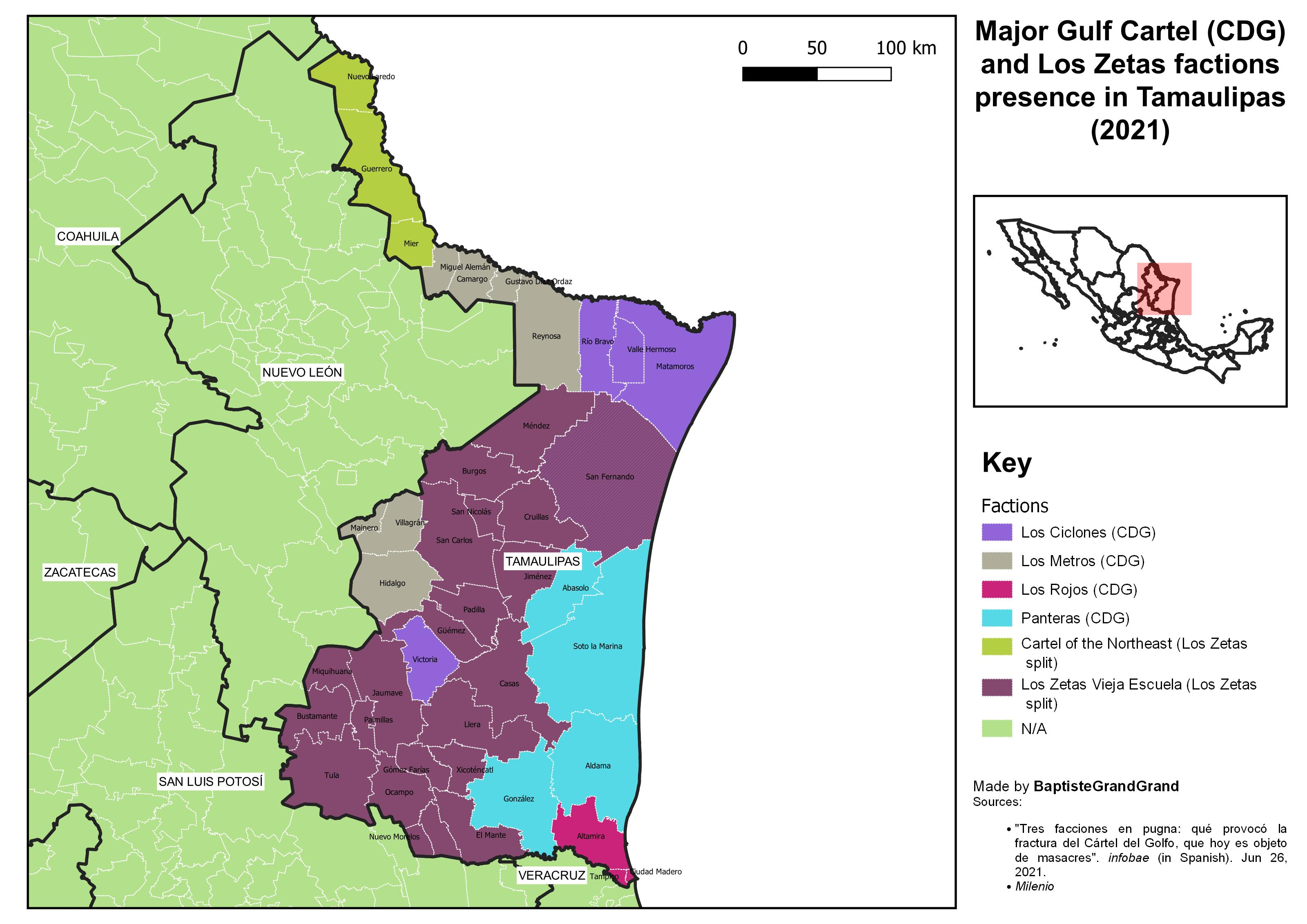
- Los Ciclones
- Founded: 2015
- Founded by: José Álfredo Cárdenas Mártineza "El Contador"; Evaristo Cruz alías "El Vaquero"; Víctor Hugo "El Chaparro"
- Founding location: Matamoros, Tamaulipas, Mexico
- Years active: 2015–present
- Territory: Nuevo León, Tamaulipas, San Luis Potosí
- Ethnicity: Mexican
- Allies: Gulf Cartel; Los Rojos; Los Fresitas; Jalisco New Generation Cartel
- Rivals: Los Metros; Cártel del Noreste; Los Dragones; Sinaloa Cartel

Los Ciclones is a faction of the Gulf Cartel, a Mexican drug cartel. This faction was created in 2015, with the Cártel del Noreste and Los Metros as its main enemies. Los Ciclones had as their area of influence the US-Mexico border crossing between Matamoros and Brownsville, Texas.

== Background ==
Beginning as an armed wing, they were created after a dispute between two of the main leaders of the CDG, Osiel Cárdenas Guillén and his brother, Antonio "Tony Tormenta", especially to confront Los Zetas founded by Osiel, they were formed by former members of the state police and the army, standing out for their extreme violence and the use of military tactics, becoming their personal guard. At the time of the separation with Los Zetas, Los Escorpiones took a more important role in the organization. On 5 November 2010, "Tony Tormenta", as well as four of his bodyguards, three sailors and a soldier engaged in a confrontation that lasted nearly eight hours, and involved 660 Marines, three helicopters and 17 vehicles, which left several "narcoblockades", suspension of classes in several educational institutions and closure of three international bridges that paralyzed the city. Two bodyguards who survived were Marcos Antonio Cortez Rodríguez, "Escorpión 37", (Tony Tormenta's trusted man and who was in charge of the armed wing), and Jesús González Rodríguez, "Escorpión 43".

For several years it was believed that the group had dissolved, but in 2015, a cell emerged in Matamoros and Tampico that initially called itself Grupo Escorpiones. These maintained their connections with the police, since their leader was Lázaro Martínez Rodríguez alias “El Escorpión” who was a ministerial police officer and chief of police in the city of Madero, until he was also murdered. It was not until years later that it was confirmed that the group was commanded by José Álfredo Cárdenas Mártineza "El Contador", Evaristo Cruz "El Vaquero" and Víctor Hugo "El Chaparro.
