= Lapua Cartridge Factory =

Finnish ammunition factory

Nammo Lapua Oy
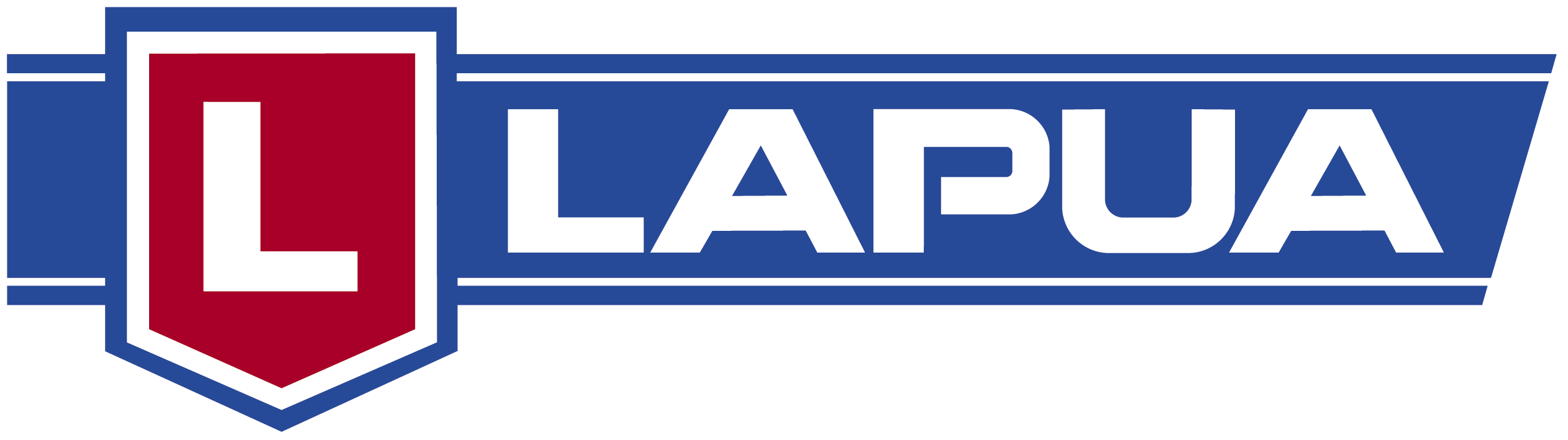
- Company type: Osakeyhtiö
- Industry: Arms industry
- Founded: 1923; 103 years ago
- Headquarters: Lapua, Finland
- Key people: Raimo Olavi Helasmäki (CEO)
- Products: Ammunition
- Revenue: EUR 96.942 million (2023)
- Number of employees: 225 (2023)
- Parent: Nammo
- Website: www.lapua.com

Lapua Cartridge Factory (Finnish: Lapuan patruunatehdas), which has, since 1998, operated as Nammo Lapua Oy, is a Finnish firearms ammunition manufacturer based in its eponymic town of Lapua. It is currently wholly owned by its parent company Nammo.

Previously, between 1927 and 1991, it used to be operated as Valtion Patruunatehdas (English: State Cartridge Factory), abbreviated VPT. Locally the factory is nicknamed Paukku ("bang").

== History ==
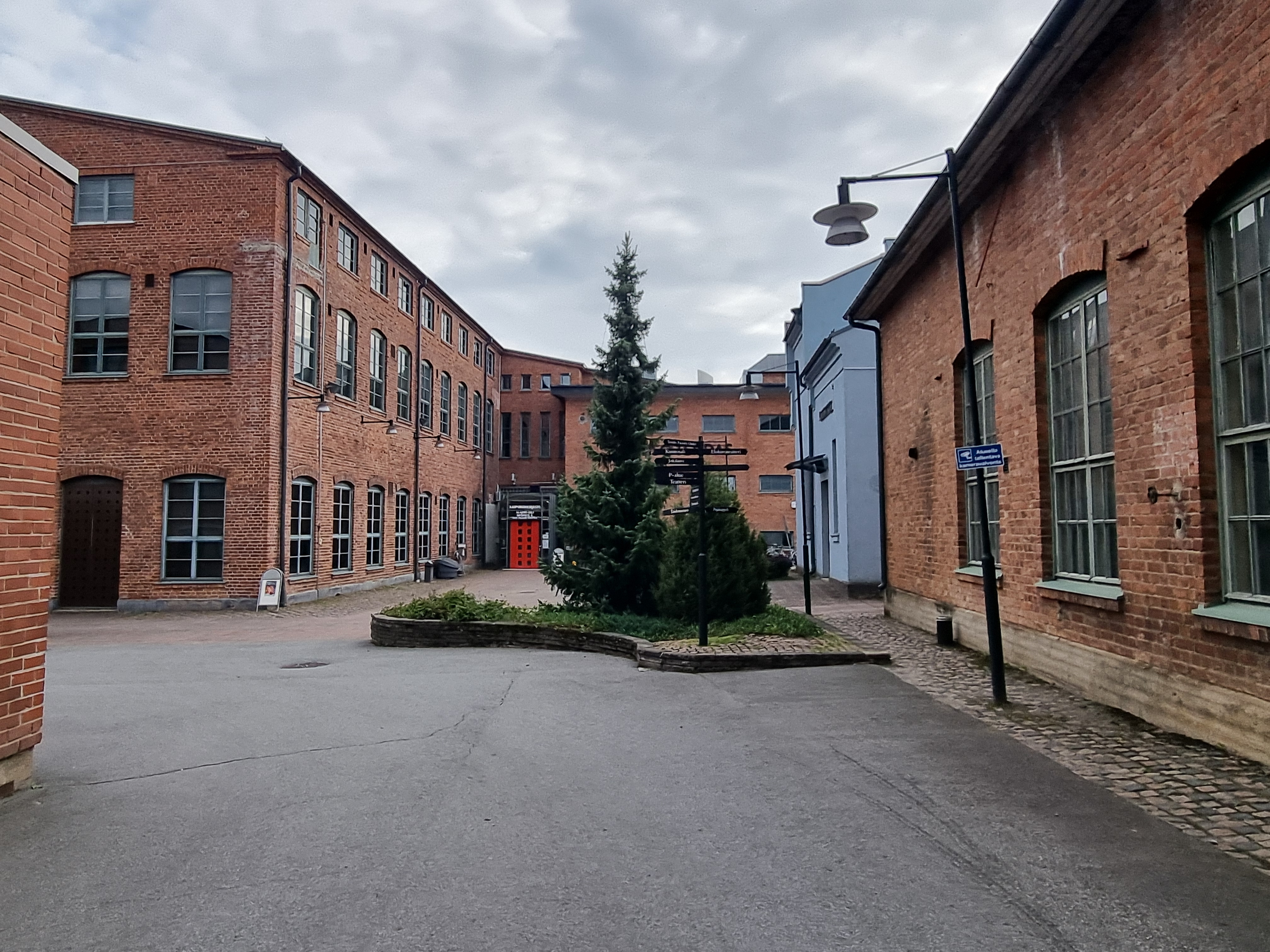
The old Lapua Cartridge Factory compound

In the early 20th century a sawmill was planned and buildings were built for it in Lapua. However, it turned out that the current of the Lapua River was too slow for a sawmill, and the parliament of the then-newly independent Finland intervened, buying the estate for the Defence Forces in May 1923 and establishing a cartridge factory there. The capability to manufacture firearms ammunition in sufficient quantities was considered a critical national security and security of supply matter, and Lapua was considered to be both far enough from the eastern border, as well as its and the surrounding region's population politically reliable in the aftermath of the Civil War of 1918. The cartridge factory had its official opening on 31 January 1925. In 1927 the factory was officially named Valtion Patruunatehdas.

In the 1930s the cartridge factory started making a name through success in shooting sports, with the first notable victories in the 27th ISSF World Shooting Championships in 1930.

In 1932 when the factory was developing a new 7.62 mm "D bullet" for the Finnish Defence Forces (FDF), a Soviet spy infiltrated the factory compound, poisoned the CEO Volter Asplund dead and stole the blueprints. The development process led to the adoption of the D-166 bullet for the new standard 7.62×53mmR cartridge of the FDF, and it entered production in 1936.

During the Second World War the facilities of the factory were dispersed. A separate underground facility was set up during the Winter War in Kanavuori, Jyväskylä. The Soviet Air Forces attempted to bomb the Lapua factory, but without success, as blacking out the town and setting decoy fires elsewhere managed to misguide the bombers.

In 1947 the factory was merged to Valtion Metallitehtaat ('State Metal Factories'), later known as Valmet.

A disastrous explosion took place in the factory on 13 April 1976, claiming the lives of 40 factory workers and completely obliterating the loading building of the factory. As of 2010, this has been the worst explosion disaster in Finland. The explosion caused the loading facilities of the factory to be moved away from central Lapua to Joutkallio, several kilometres to the southeast from the outermost Lapua town dwellings, followed by new cartridge case and bullet manufacturing facilities. The new factory compound was completed in 1984.

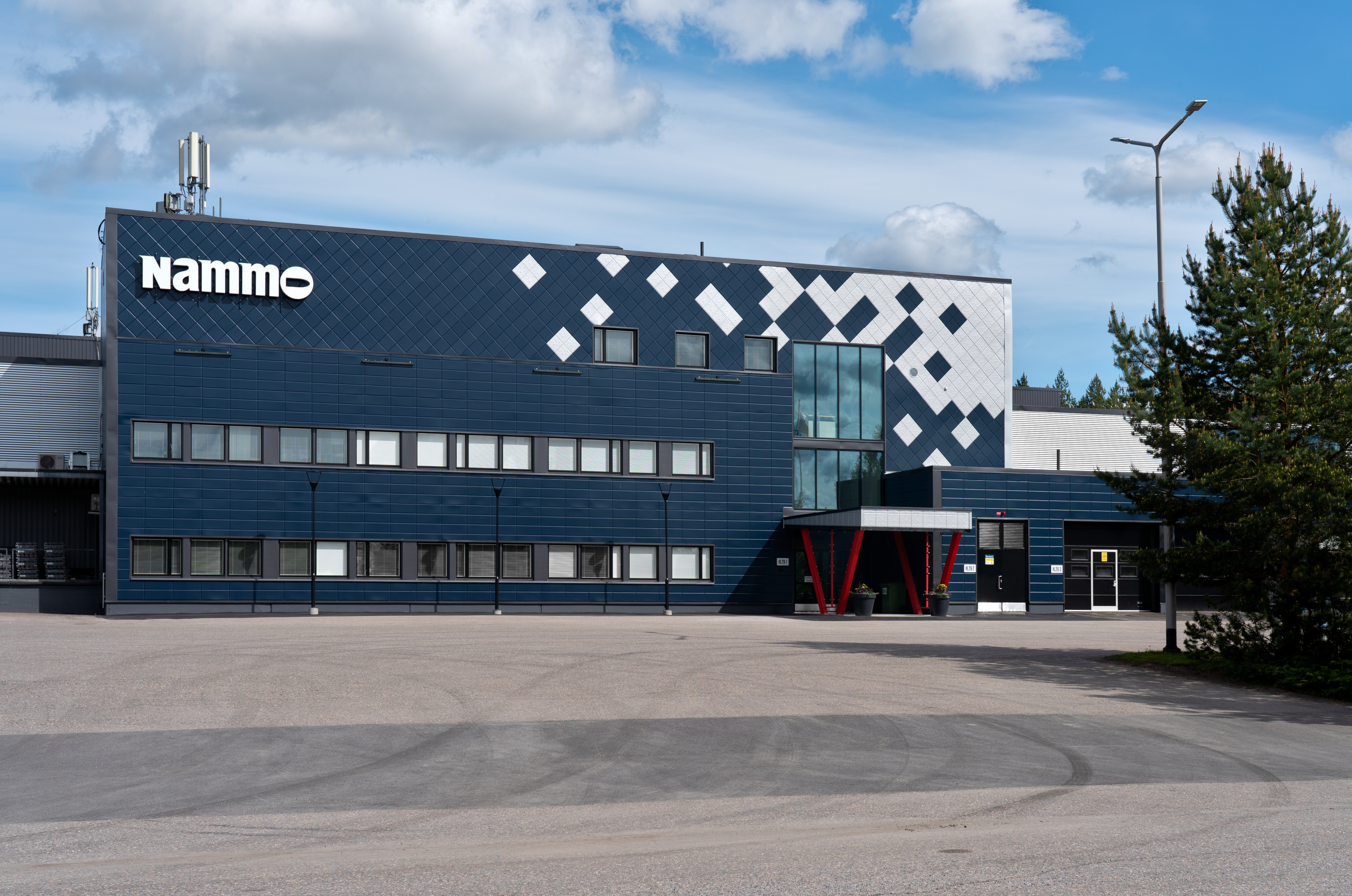
The new Lapua Cartridge Factory in 2023

In 1991 the factory was split from Valmet and restructured as a joint stock company under the name Patruunatehdas Lapua Oy ('Cartridge Factory Lapua Ltd'). In 1992 the Lapua Cartridge Factory bought and made the German manufacturer SK Jagd- und Sportmunitions GmbH its subsidiary.

Further restructuring of the Finnish defence industry was made in 1996, with the cartridge factory being transferred from direct government ownership to the newly formed Patria Industries Oyj, and the company operating the cartridge factory renamed Patria Lapua Oy. In 1998 Patria, Swedish Celsius AB and Norwegian Raufoss ASA decided to merge their ammunition factories as Nammo AS. Since then the company operating the Lapua Cartridge Factory has been called Nammo Lapua Oy.
