= Valor por Tamaulipas =

News page on Facebook about Tamaulipas, Mexico

- Valor por Tamaulipas logo
- Formation: 1 January 2012
- Founder: Anonymous user
- Type: Facebook page
- Purpose: Mexican drug war reporting
- Region served: Tamaulipas, Mexico
- Website: Valor por Tamaulipas

Valor por Tamaulipas ("Courage for Tamaulipas") is an inactive Facebook page that covers security updates in the Mexican state of Tamaulipas. It was founded by an anonymous user on 1 January 2012, and its goal is to share information with other social media users on drug-related violence and risk situations all across the state. With over 515,000 likes on Facebook, Valor por Tamaulipas routinely posts messages and photos of crime scenes on its page. In a country where many journalists have been assassinated for writing about drug trafficking and organized crime, the page survives under anonymity, but it has not been immune to threats.

In early 2013, a Mexican drug trafficking organization issued fliers offering a reward of $600,000 pesos (US$46,000) for anyone who could give out information to locate the administrator of Valor por Tamaulipas or any of his family members. The administrator, however, openly defied the criminal organization's threat through Facebook. His wife and children reportedly fled to the United States after the threats for security reasons, but the citizen journalist stated on the Facebook page that he had decided to stay in Mexico and continue updating at Valor por Tamaulipas. In December 2014, however, the administrator announced his retirement from social media.

== History ==
The Facebook page Valor por Tamaulipas ("Courage for Tamaulipas") was created by an anonymous user on 1 January 2012 after getting his inspiration from other websites that anonymously reported the drug violence in Mexico. The page regularly posts messages and photos of crime scenes; its goal is to report on drug-related violence and situations of risk in the Mexican state of Tamaulipas. It frequently posts messages and photos of the criminal activities in the state, including but not limited to law enforcement in action, photos of alleged criminals, vehicles of reported extortionists, abandoned vehicles left on the roadside, roadblocks, arsons, oil theft activities, drug traffickers on the job, and the like.

Given the high levels of drug-related activities in northern Mexico and in Tamaulipas, many Facebook users also check Valor por Tamaulipas to verify if there is a shootout in their area, to know in what part of a highway a carjacking took place, or to see if someone is reported missing. The information found at Valor por Tamaulipas is shared by Internet users themselves; the administrator, on the other hand, was active almost all hours during the day and throughout the whole week. Most of the Mexican mainstream media outlets play down the violence because they fear reprisals from the country's criminal organizations. Given the censorship, Valor por Tamaulipas was a popular outlet for crime watchdogs concerned with the violence in Tamaulipas. According to crime journalist James Barger from InSight Crime, the information in Valor por Tamaulipas is "spotty, sometimes unreliable, but often the only source of what [is] happening". Several Internet users in Mexico, the United States, and in other countries around the world have shown their support for Valor por Tamaulipas' work and have followed their reports on Facebook and/or Twitter.

The page had over 210,000 likes on Facebook in April 2013; on Twitter, Valor por Tamaulipas had approximately 24,400 followers.

=== Background ===
The state of Tamaulipas is home to two transnational criminal organizations – the Gulf Cartel and Los Zetas – who fight for control of the smuggling routes along the Texan border. This border area is a major route for human trafficking, arms smuggling, and for the international narcotics trade. The Gulf Cartel, according to the United States Department of State, started in the 1930s as a bootlegging gang and later transformed into a full-fledged drug trafficking organization in the 1980s. Los Zetas, on the other hand, were formed in the late 1990s and early 2000s by former soldiers of the Mexican Army who were hired by the imprisoned Osiel Cárdenas Guillén to become the Gulf Cartel's new muscle. In an apparent power struggle, however, Los Zetas and the Gulf Cartel broke relations in early 2010 and went to war in the state of Tamaulipas and its bordering states, prompting daily shootouts, kidnappings, and mass slayings.

Mexico is among the most dangerous countries on the planet in which to practice journalism, particularly on the topics of organized crime and drug trafficking. Since 2000, nearly 100 journalists have been kidnapped or killed throughout the country; many of the killings, however, remain unsolved and unpunished. The high levels of violence and attacks on the press have forced many local media outlets to downplay their coverage. As a result, many people have turned to social media outlets like Valor por Tamaulipas to see hourly updates on the security atmosphere in their areas. But social media reporting carries its own risks too; in September 2011, journalist and blogger María Elizabeth Macías Castro was decapitated by Los Zetas for posting their organized crime activities in her personal blog. That same month, two alleged Twitter users were killed and hanged on a bridge in Nuevo Laredo, Tamaulipas for denouncing on Twitter.

In January 2013, Tamaulipas state had a homicide rate of 36 per every 100,000 people; kidnappings and extortion were also widespread.

== Organized crime threats ==
In June 2012, the Gulf Cartel allegedly created a Facebook page called Anti Valor por Tamaulipas ("Anti-Courage for Tamaulipas"), which intended to counter the goals of the page. It stated that the information spread by Valor por Tamaulipas "[was] not a benefit to the community." In early 2013, Anti Valor por Tamaulipas had approximately 11,244 likes on Facebook.

Through several fliers issued in Ciudad Victoria, Tamaulipas, a drug trafficking organization offered a $600,000 peso (roughly US$46,000) reward to anyone that could give them information on the whereabouts of the administrator of Valor por Tamaulipas, or to identify any of his family members, whether they are his parents, brothers and sisters, children or wife. The flier included the phone number (834)-104-7370, which has the area code of Tamaulipas. (Note: The area code 834 is from the capital of the Tamaulipas, Ciudad Victoria, where the threat was made.) The administrator responded by saying that "[he was] not playing at being a hero, [and was] doing what [he had] to do as a citizen." He also thanked the visitors who contributed to the page and gave him support throughout the project, and asked the Mexican Armed Forces to continue their fight against organized crime. The administrator said, too, that he would continue to his crime reporting at Valor por Tamaulipas even if that might cost him his life. On its page the administrator stated that after hearing about the threat, his wife and children left to the United States for security reasons. He also asked his visitors to refrain from using their personal Facebook or Twitter accounts when uploading information to the page since that could put them at risk. He believes that the Mexican criminal organization known as Los Zetas or state officials working for them are probably responsible for this threat. (Note: Valor por Tamaulipas believes that the threats also come from corrupt state authorities by "the way that the threat is written, with few grammar mistakes and without the signature of any criminal group.")

On 20 February 2013, a video was released on the web depicting a supposed collaborator of Valor por Tamaulipas, kneeling down and with his hands in his pockets. Beside him was a masked, camouflaged man with a firearm. The supposed collaborator said calmly, "Please refrain from publishing any information – if not, this is the price you will pay." After the kneeling man warned Internet users against collaborating with Valor por Tamaulipas, the gunman pulled the trigger and shot him in the head, apparently killing the man. The administrator of Valor por Tamaulipas responded by posting a message on Facebook and saying that he will not take a stance on the authenticity of the video, but stated that he does not recognize the man. Notinfomex blog website reported that the Gulf Cartel was behind the video, but the information and authenticity have not been officially confirmed.

In April 2013, Proceso magazine received information from supposed informants from the Office of the General Prosecutor in Tamaulipas who indicated that the state governor Egidio Torre Cantú wanted to close the page by discrediting it with false reports. The governor, the report said, was concerned that Valor por Tamaulipas "had become a news reference that showed Mexico and the world that it was organized crime, not him, who controlled the state."

On 22 May 2013, Valor por Tamaulipas released a video sent to the page by an alleged organized crime group. In the video, a man and a woman are interrogated by alleged drug traffickers and ask the administrator to close the page and reveal his true identity. The couple was presented as supposed family members of the administrator; however, he later indicated that they were not his family, and that the criminal organization had either confused them or simply targeted a random family to pressure to administrator to close the page. Valor por Tamaulipas responded by sending a message to the authorities in Tamaulipas and blamed them for the death of a person who died of a cardiac arrest after the couple was kidnapped; the administrator also accused the Tamaulipas authorities of protecting Los Zetas drug cartel.

== Closure and renewal ==
Early in the morning of 1 April 2013, the Facebook and Twitter accounts of Valor por Tamaulipas were shut down unexpectedly and without any explanation. A new page with the same name was created by other administrators, who said that they did not know what had happened to the original administrator but that they wanted to continue his work nonetheless. This raised concerns about who was actually working behind the scenes to keep the page running. Another page run by other users and with a similar name, Responsabilidad por Tamaulipas ("Responsibility for Tamaulipas"), posted on their page that Valor por Tamaulipas had only closed temporarily in order to improve the page and protect the administrator. (Note: The administrator of Valor por Tamaulipas indicated, however, that Responsabilidad por Tamaulipas reported this information without his consent.) They advised online users to ignore websites that posed as the original page.

About a week later, the original page of Valor por Tamaulipas reopened, but the administrator issued a communiqué in which he indicated that the page was going to close permanently after 8 days. On Facebook the administrator explained that he could not continue collaborating at Valor por Tamaulipas because of his inability to properly manage the page. "In my case, organized crime won, but it has defeated me and not society; it has defeated me and my family, but it has not defeated that thousands of contributors who trusted this page and reported despite their fears", the administrator said. He also talked about his experience and the lessons he learned as head of the page, and then thanked those who supported and trusted him for over a year. The administrator concluded by asking his followers to forgive him.

In the eight days following the announcement, the page operated as it normally did. After reconsidering several times, the administrator decided to keep maintaining the page, and thanked the media and his followers for supporting him. He concluded by saying, "I am not sure if keeping this page will benefit the people of goodwill ... only God will know if I was irresponsible or stubborn in doing so ... On another note, I confess that it has been an honor and pleasure to continue collaborating and working as a team with all of you. Thank you, people of goodwill from Tamaulipas. I owe it all to you."

== Block, reopen, and further threats ==
On 9 June 2014, the Facebook page was blocked for a month for uploading gun-related posts, which is considered a violation of Facebook's policies. In order to continue his reporting, the admin posted on his Twitter and Google accounts.

On 15 October 2014, the former co-admin of the sister page Responsabilidad for Tamaulipas, María del Rosario Fuentes Rubio (also known by her Twitter account @Miut3 and Felina), was kidnapped, tortured, and killed by alleged organized crime members. She had a strong follower-base on Twitter and was known for posting about risk situations, shootouts, and information about criminal groups from Tamaulipas. Her captors allegedly posted several tweets on her profile, prompting shocking reactions on social media. The first tweet revealed her identity and profession as a doctor, and ended by saying that her "life had come to an end". Two minutes later, another tweet asked others to not make the mistakes she did (of posting about organized crime). The third tweet warned Valor por Tamaulipas and two other Twitter users, @Bandolera7 and @civilarmado_mx, of posting about risk situations. The fourth and final tweet said the following: "Close your accounts, don't risk your families the way I did, I ask you all for forgiveness," and included two photos of her. One of them showed her alive, and the second one showed her corpse splattered in blood. Twitter later deactivated the account but the photos had already leaked across social media.

Valor por Tamaulipas confirmed her death on its Facebook page and lamented the incident. The admin stated that @Miut3 was a collaborator at Valor por Tamaulipas and former admin at Responsabilidad por Tamaulipas. It was unknown if her murder was linked to her activities on social media or to her profession as a doctor; one version suggested that she was kidnapped by organized crime after a son of an alleged drug lord died of medical complications, and that her captors discovered her identity when they took her phone and decided to threaten the rest of the online community. Valor por Tamaulipas does not believe this version, however. The admin said he had reasons to believe that @Miut3 was targeted for her online activities. Valor por Tamaulipas stated that @Miut3 was threatened by Twitter user @garzalaura142 a week before she was killed; the admin indicated that the threats used similar wordings and that that was "no coincidence".

== Admin's retirement and new management ==
On 29 November 2014, the admin of the page announced his retirement on Facebook. He stated that he was leaving the page for personal reasons, but that Valor por Tamaulipas would continue under new management. That person, he said, had some relationship with law enforcement. The admin believes that this would be of benefit for the cyber community because it would allow for citizen reports to reach law enforcement directly. The admin also announced that the pages Responsabilidad, Fortaleza, and Valor por la Huasteca would go under new management too. The new management would be composed of people who he deemed trustworthy given their long history of support or because they had suffered a loss as a result of the violence. In a closing statement, he bid farewell by thanking God for bringing happiness to his personal and professional life. In the comment section of the Facebook post, many people thanked the admin for his support. Some of them, however, expressed their concerned with the new administration given his/her relationship with the government.

== Sister page and similar projects ==
Valor por Tamaulipas has a sister page called Esperanza por Tamaulipas ("Hope for Tamaulipas"), which uploads pictures of people who have been kidnapped or are reported as disappeared in the state. The page has a list of more than 120 people who have disappeared between 2010 and 2012. Other projects like Valor por Michoacán SDR ("Courage for Michoacán – Risk Situations"), which reported about the drug-related violence and role of the self-defense groups in Michoacán since 2013, have many followers and likes on Twitter (@ValorMichoacan) and Facebook (/ValorPorMichoacan).

== Acronyms used in page ==
Valor por Tamaulipas uses several acronyms in posts on Facebook and Twitter:

Acronym	Spanish	English	Citations
SDR	Situación de Riesgo	Risk Situation	
PSDR	Posible Situación de Riesgo	Possible Risk Situation	
FFAAS	Fuerzas Armadas	Armed Forces	
GEM	Glorioso Ejército Mexicano	Glorious Mexican Army	
FC	Fuerzas Castrenses	Military Forces	
VxT	Valor por Tamaulipas	Courage for Tamaulipas	
TPM and/or TxM	Todo por Mexico.com	All For Mexico.com	
GA	Gente Armada	Armed People	
HA	Hombres Armados	Armed Men	
CA	Civiles Armados	Armed Civilians	
CO	Crimen Organizado	Organized Crime	
GHs	Guardias o Halcones	Guards or watchers	

== See also ==
- Mexican drug war
- List of journalists killed in Mexico
