= List of ship launches in 1948 =

The list of ship launches in 1948 includes a chronological list of all ships launched in 1948.

Date	Ship	Class / type	Builder	Location	Country	Notes
14 February	Granuaile	Lightship tender	Harland & Wolff	Belfast	United Kingdom	For Trinity House.
27 February	British Security	Tanker	Harland & Wolff	Belfast	United Kingdom	For British Tanker Company.
6 March	Newport News	Des Moines-class heavy cruiser	Newport News Shipbuilding	Newport News, Virginia	United States	For United States Navy.
11 March	Liparus	Tanker	Harland & Wolff	Belfast	United Kingdom	For Anglo-Saxon Petroleum Company.
11 March	Soestdyk	Cargo ship	Harland & Wolff	Belfast	United Kingdom	For Holland America Line.
19 April	BO-192	Kronshtadt-class submarine chaser	Zelenodolsk Gorky Plant	Zelenedolsk	Soviet Union	For Soviet Navy.
22 April	Somali	Cargo Ship	Barclay Curle	Glasgow	United Kingdom	For P&O
24 April	BO-187	Kronshtadt-class submarine chaser	Zelenodolsk Gorky Plant	Zelenedolsk	Soviet Union	For Soviet Navy.
24 April	BO-188	Kronshtadt-class submarine chaser	Zelenodolsk Gorky Plant	Zelenedolsk	Soviet Union	For Soviet Navy.
24 April	BO-190	Kronshtadt-class submarine chaser	Zelenodolsk Gorky Plant	Zelenedolsk	Soviet Union	For Soviet Navy.
24 April	BO-191	Kronshtadt-class submarine chaser	Zelenodolsk Gorky Plant	Zelenedolsk	Soviet Union	For Soviet Navy.
24 April	BO-193	Kronshtadt-class submarine chaser	Zelenodolsk Gorky Plant	Zelenedolsk	Soviet Union	For Soviet Navy.
11 May	Magdalena	Cargo liner	Harland & Wolff	Belfast	United Kingdom	For Royal Mail Lines
20 May	Horta	Refrigerated cargo ship	Blyth Dry Docks & Shipbuilding Co. Ltd	Blyth, Northumberland	United Kingdom	For Compagnia de Navigacion Carregadores Acoreanos.
21 May	Volador	Tench-class submarine	Portsmouth Naval Shipyard	Kittery, Maine	United States	For United States Navy.
25 May	Ramore Head	Cargo ship	Harland & Wolff	Belfast	United Kingdom	For Ulster Steamship Co.
26 May	Setter 1	Whaler	Harland & Wolff	Belfast	United Kingdom	For United Whalers Ltd.
8 June	British Strength	Tanker	Harland & Wolff	Belfast	United Kingdom	For British Tanker Company.
8 June	Citos	Cargo ship	Blyth Dry Docks & Shipbuilding Co. Ltd	Blyth, Northumberland	United Kingdom	For Rederi A/B Sirius.
10 June	Schiedyk	Cargo ship	Harland & Wolff	Belfast	United Kingdom	For Holland America Line.
22 June	Bulwark	Centaur-class aircraft carrier	Harland and Wolff	Belfast, Northern Ireland	United Kingdom	For Royal Navy.
6 July	Jalta	Tanker	Harland & Wolff	Belfast	United Kingdom	For A/S Bulls Rederi.
6 July	Setter 2	Whaler	Harland & Wolff	Belfast	United Kingdom	For United Whalers Ltd.
22 July	Hibernia	Ferry	Harland & Wolff	Belfast	United Kingdom	For British Railways.
20 August	Anzac	Battle-class destroyer	Williamstown Naval Dockyard	Melbourne, Victoria	Australia	For Royal Australian Navy.
3 September	Cap Juby	Deep-sea trawler	Chantiers et Ateliers Augustin Normand	Le Havre	France	For: E. Noel
4 September	Brandanger	Single screw cargo ship	Joseph L. Thompson & Co, Sunderland	Sunderland, England	Norway	
8 September	Carioca Shell	Tank barge	Blyth Dry Docks & Shipbuilding Co. Ltd	Blyth, Northumberland	United Kingdom	For Compagnia de Navegacao Shell-Mex do Brasil.
16 September	British Mariner	Tanker	Harland & Wolff	Belfast	United Kingdom	For British Tanker Company.
21 September	Cambria	Ferry	Harland & Wolff	Belfast	United Kingdom	For British Railways.
5 October	Himalaya	Himalaya-class ocean liner	Vickers-Armstrongs	Barrow-in-Furness, England	United Kingdom	For P&O
19 October	Sabaramati	Ferry	Harland & Wolff	Belfast	United Kingdom	For Bombay Steam Navigation Co.
19 October	Saravasti	Ferry	Harland & Wolff	Belfast	United Kingdom	For Bombay Steam Navigation Co.
2 November	Antilochus	Cargo ship	Harland & Wolff	Belfast	United Kingdom	For Blue Funnel Line.
4 November	Borgny	Tanker	Harland & Wolff	Belfast	United Kingdom	For Fred Olsen & Co.
6 November	Sołdek	Cargo Ship	Stocznia Gdańska	Gdańsk	Poland	For Polska Żegluga Morska.
16 November	British Workman	Tanker	Harland & Wolff	Belfast	United Kingdom	For British Tanker Company.
28 November	BO-194	Kronshtadt-class submarine chaser	Zelenodolsk Gorky Plant	Zelenedolsk	Soviet Union	For Soviet Navy.
13 December	Penrith Castle	Cargo ship	Blyth Dry Docks & Shipbuilding Co. Ltd	Blyth, Northumberland	United Kingdom	For Lancashire Shipping Co Ltd.
13 December	BO-195	Kronshtadt-class submarine chaser	Zelenodolsk Gorky Plant	Zelenedolsk	Soviet Union	For Soviet Navy.
18 December	Sea Gladiator	Aircraft transport vessel	James Pollock & Sons	Faversham	United Kingdom	For Fleet Air Arm. Contract cancelled, completed as the coaster Goldhind for E. J. & W. Goldsmith Ltd.
18 December	Olga Mærsk	Cargo ship	Odense Steel Shipyard	Odense, Denmark	Denmark	For A.P. Moller-Maersk Group
28 December	Setter 3	Whaler	Harland & Wolff	Belfast	United Kingdom	For United Whalers Ltd.
Unknown date	Bournemouth Belle	Passenger ship	J. Bolson & Son Ltd.	Poole	United Kingdom	For J. Bolson & Son Ltd.
Unknown date	Dara	Cargo liner	Barclay, Curle & Co. Ltd.	Glasgow	United Kingdom	For British India Steam Navigation Company.
Unknown date	Grass Knot	Type C1 ship	Southeastern Shipbuilding Corporation	Savannah, Georgia	United States	For private owner.
Unknown date	MFV.1226	Motor Fishing Vessel	Berthon Boat Co. Ltd	Lymington	United Kingdom	For Royal Navy.
Unknown date	NCPX S-1	Barge	Alabama Drydock and Shipbuilding Company	Mobile, Alabama	United States	For North Carolina Pulp Co.
Unknown date	NCPX S-2	Barge	Alabama Drydock and Shipbuilding Company	Mobile, Alabama	United States	For North Carolina Pulp Co.
Unknown date	Nusken	Cargo ship	Blyth Dry Docks & Shipbuilding Co. Ltd	Blyth, Northumberland	United Kingdom	For Skibs A/S Randi.
Unknown date	Poole Belle	Passenger ship	J. Bolson & Son Ltd.	Poole	United Kingdom	For J. Bolson & Son Ltd.
Unknown date	Sailmaker's Splice	Type C1 ship	Southeastern Shipbuilding Corporation	Savannah, Georgia	United States	For private owner.
Unknown date	SK-137	Barge	Alabama Drydock and Shipbuilding Company	Mobile, Alabama	United States	For Southern Kraft Corporation.
Unknown date	SK-138	Barge	Alabama Drydock and Shipbuilding Company	Mobile, Alabama	United States	For Southern Kraft Corporation.
Unknown date	SK-139	Barge	Alabama Drydock and Shipbuilding Company	Mobile, Alabama	United States	For Southern Kraft Corporation.
Unknown date	SK-140	Barge	Alabama Drydock and Shipbuilding Company	Mobile, Alabama	United States	For Southern Kraft Corporation.
Unknown date	SK-141	Barge	Alabama Drydock and Shipbuilding Company	Mobile, Alabama	United States	For Southern Kraft Corporation.
Unknown date	SK-142	Barge	Alabama Drydock and Shipbuilding Company	Mobile, Alabama	United States	For Southern Kraft Corporation.
Unknown date	SK-143	Barge	Alabama Drydock and Shipbuilding Company	Mobile, Alabama	United States	For Southern Kraft Corporation.
Unknown date	SK-144	Barge	Alabama Drydock and Shipbuilding Company	Mobile, Alabama	United States	For Southern Kraft Corporation.
Unknown date	SK-145	Barge	Alabama Drydock and Shipbuilding Company	Mobile, Alabama	United States	For Southern Kraft Corporation.
Unknown date	Unnamed	Launch	J. Bolson & Son Ltd.	Poole	United Kingdom	For United Africa Co. Ltd.
