= USS Sustain (AFDM-7) =

AFDM-3-class dry dock of the United States Navy

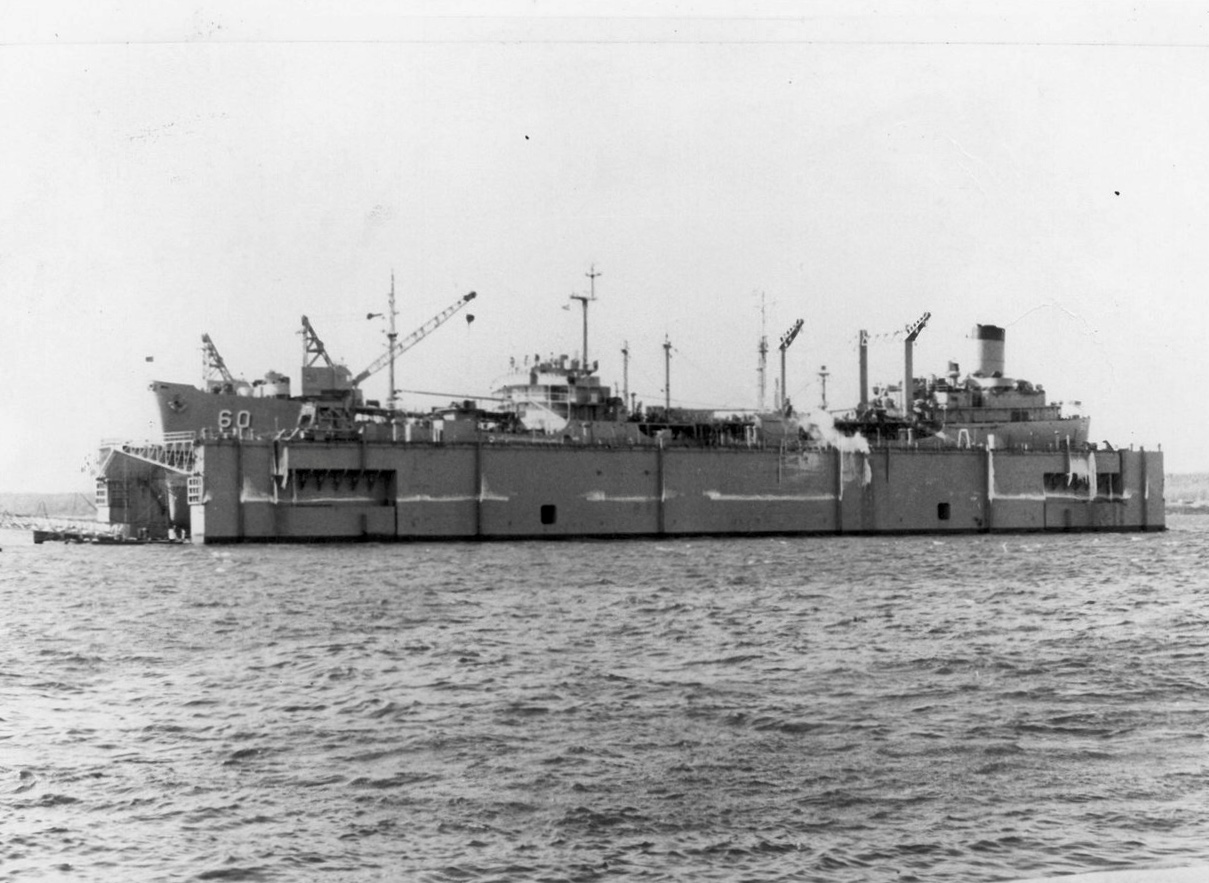
- USS AFDM-7 and USS Nantahala (AO-60)

History

United States
- Name: Sustain
- Namesake: Sustain
- Builder: Everett Pacific Shipbuilding Co.
- Acquired: 1 January 1945
- Commissioned: 1945
- Decommissioned: 1 August 1997
- Reclassified: AFDM-7, 1946
- Stricken: 30 January 2007
- Home port: Melville (1972-1974); Norfolk (1974-1997)
- Identification: Callsign: NCDE; Hull number: YFD-63
- Honors and awards: See Awards
- Fate: Transferred to Atlantic Marine, 1999; Sold to Atlantic Marine, 2008
- Status: Operational in Jacksonville, Florida

General characteristics
- Class & type: AFDM-3-class floating drydock
- Displacement: 8,000 t (7,874 long tons)
- Length: 622 ft 10 in (189.84 m)
- Beam: 124 ft 0 in (37.80 m)
- Draft: 6 ft (1.8 m)
- Complement: 4 officers, 139 enlisted

The USS Sustain (AFDM-7), (formerly YFD-63), was a AFDM-3-class floating dry dock built in 1945 and operated by the United States Navy.

== Construction and career ==
YFD-63 was built by the Everett Pacific Shipbuilding Co., in Everett, Washington in 1945. Melucta with YFD-63 in tow departed Everett for Moore Dry Dock Co., Alameda, on 23 January 1945. She would be commissioned later in 1945 after her delivery to the Navy on 1 January.

On 1 August 1946, the dry dock was re-designated as AFDM-7.

On 28 October 1950, the dry dock would be on commercial lease. In 1956, AFDM-7 was towed through the Panama Canal and leased to Alabama Drydock and Shipbuilding Company.

In October 1971, the Navy would reacquire the dry dock as the lease was over. AFDM-7 would be repaired and refitted by the Navy Seabees at Davisville, January 1972. Stationed at Melville from June 1972 until 1974. In December 1972, USS Nantahala (AO-60) was dry docked inside AFDM-7 at Melville. towed to Norfolk in April 1974 and later stationed at Norfolk from 1974 until 1997. On 7 June 1979, the dry dock was finally named Sustain.

In 1984, USS Arthur W. Radford (DD-968) subsequently undergone sea trials and repairs inside Sustain. From 4 September until 9 October 1984, USS Ainsworth (FF-1090) completed work inside Sustain at Norfolk.

USS Kidd (DDG-993) returned to Norfolk and conducted an emergent dry docking with floating dry dock Sustain on 30 May, staying there for over a week for an ASW groom and implementation of the combat system operational sequencing system on 4 June 1990. Sustain was decommissioned on 1 August 1997 and leased to Atlantic Marine and Dry Dock, Inc., Jacksonville on 30 November 1999.

The dry dock broke the towline in a storm off Cape Hatteras on 14 January 2000 and drifted for 300 miles in the Gulf Stream until taken under control by salvage team and towed to Bermuda. Finally arrived at Jacksonville on 24 February 2000. Sustain was struck from the Naval Register on 30 January 2007 and later sold outright to Atlantic Marine on 29 February 2008.

In May 2010, Atlantic Marine was acquired by BAE Systems renamed BAE Systems Southeast Shipyards. In 2015, the shipyard was awarded a $27,625,758 by the Navy to dry dock USS Nitze (DDG-94), for docking selected restricted availability. On 29 March 2019, USS Detroit (LCS-7) was dry docked for repairs inside of the former Sustain.

== Awards ==
- American Campaign Medal
- Asiatic-Pacific Campaign Medal
- World War II Victory Medal
- National Defense Service Medal
- Navy Meritorious Unit Commendation
