= United States Navy reserve fleets =

Collections of inactive naval vessels of the US Navy

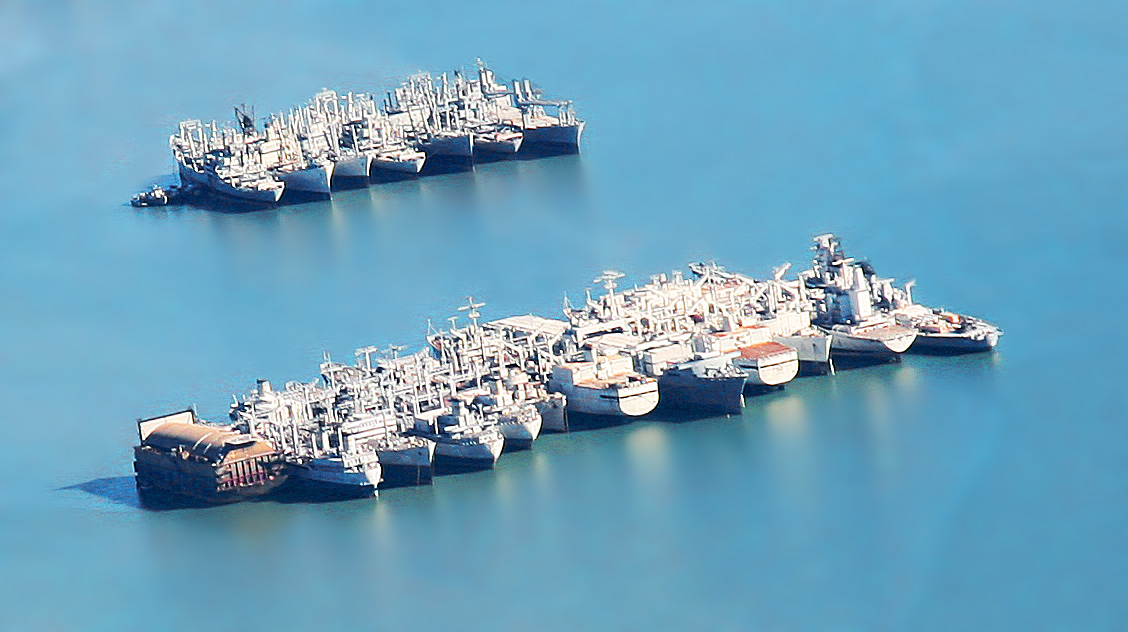
Mothballed ships in Suisun Bay, California (2010). The battleship USS Iowa at the right-side end of the group has since become a restored museum ship in San Pedro, Los Angeles.

The United States Navy maintains a number of its ships as part of a reserve fleet, often called the "Mothball Fleet". While the details of the maintenance activity have changed several times, the basics are constant: keep the ships afloat and sufficiently working so as to be reactivated quickly in an emergency.

In some cases (for instance, at the outset of the Korean War), many ships were successfully reactivated at a considerable savings in time and money. The usual fate of ships in the reserve fleet, though, is to become too old and obsolete to be of any use, at which point they are sold for scrapping or are scuttled in weapons tests.

In rare cases, the general public may intercede for ships from the reserve fleet that are about to be scrapped – usually asking for the Navy to donate them for use as museum ships, memorials, or artificial reefs.

== Administration ==
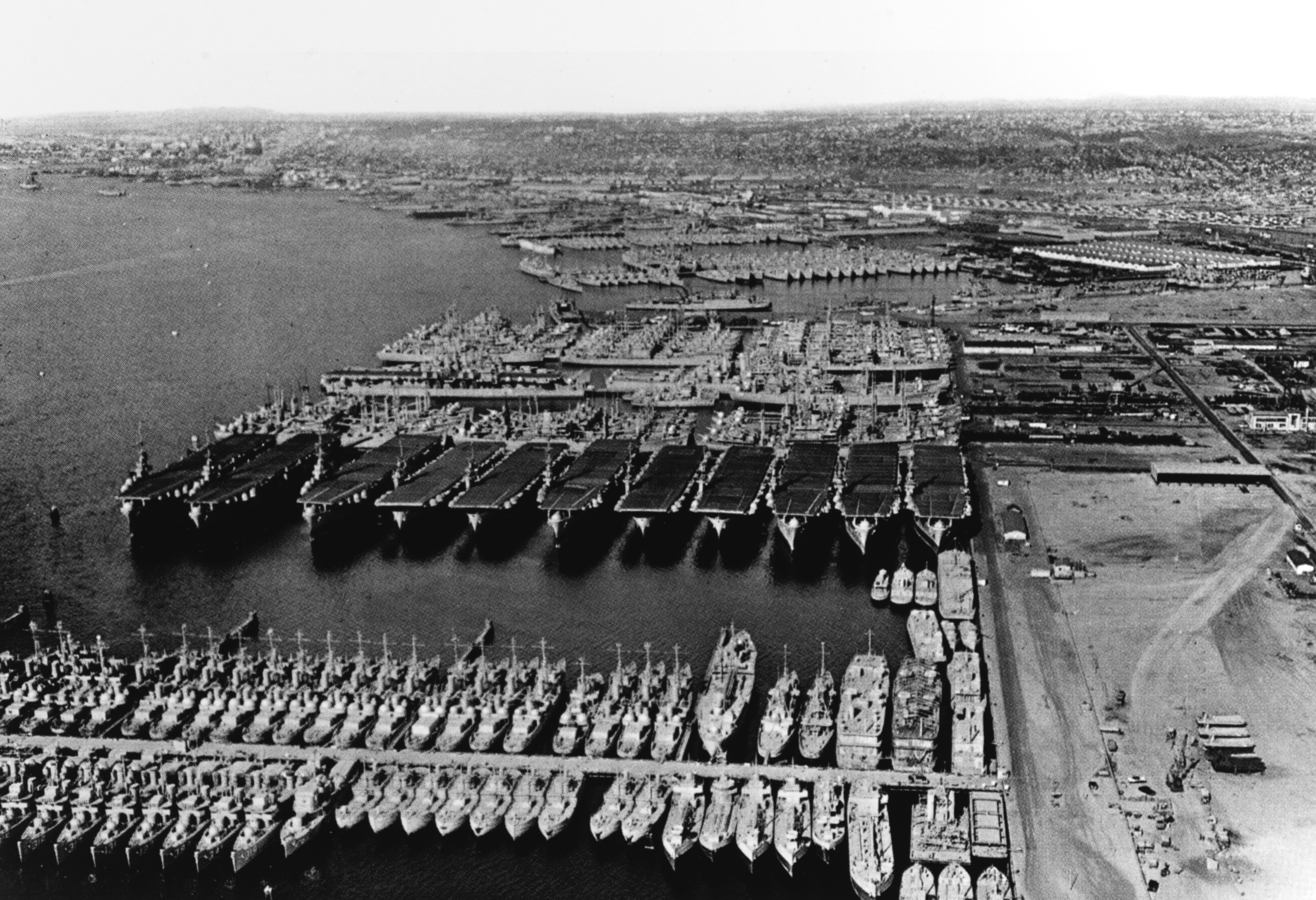
View of the reserve fleet laid up at Naval Station San Diego, circa in the 1950s

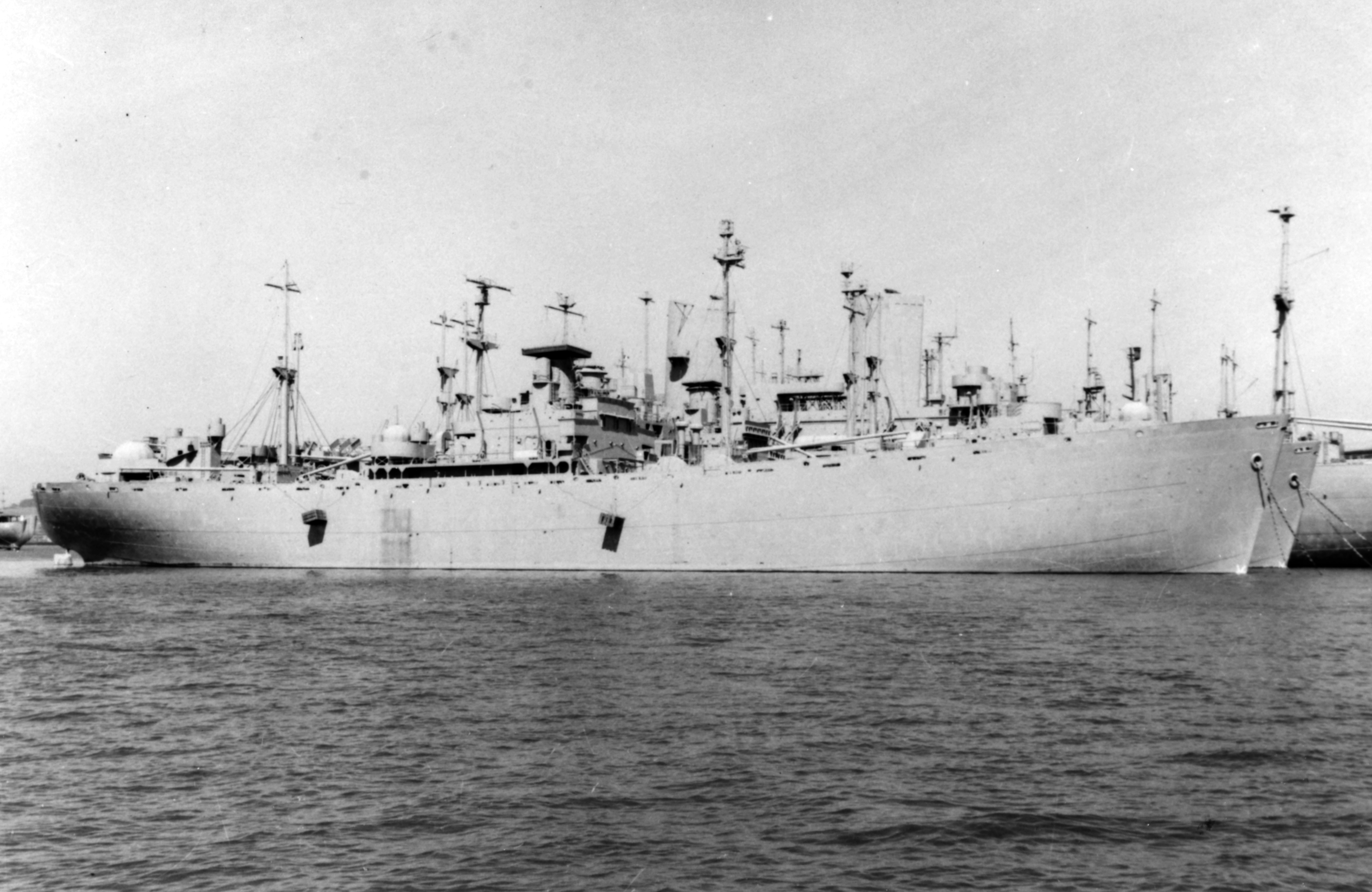
Ships in the US Reserve Fleet at Suisun Bay in 1972

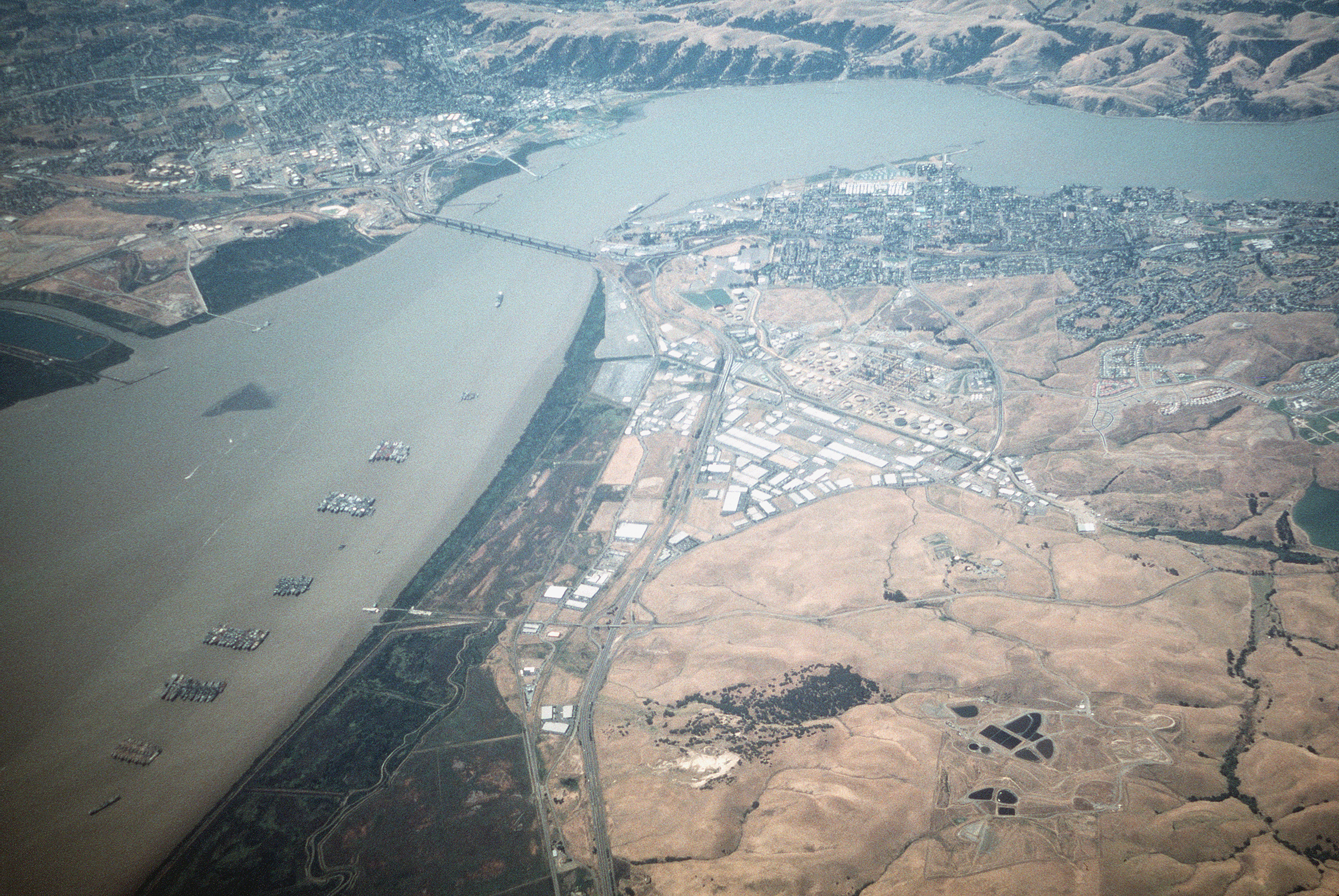
Aerial view of the US Reserve Fleet at Suisun Bay in 1995

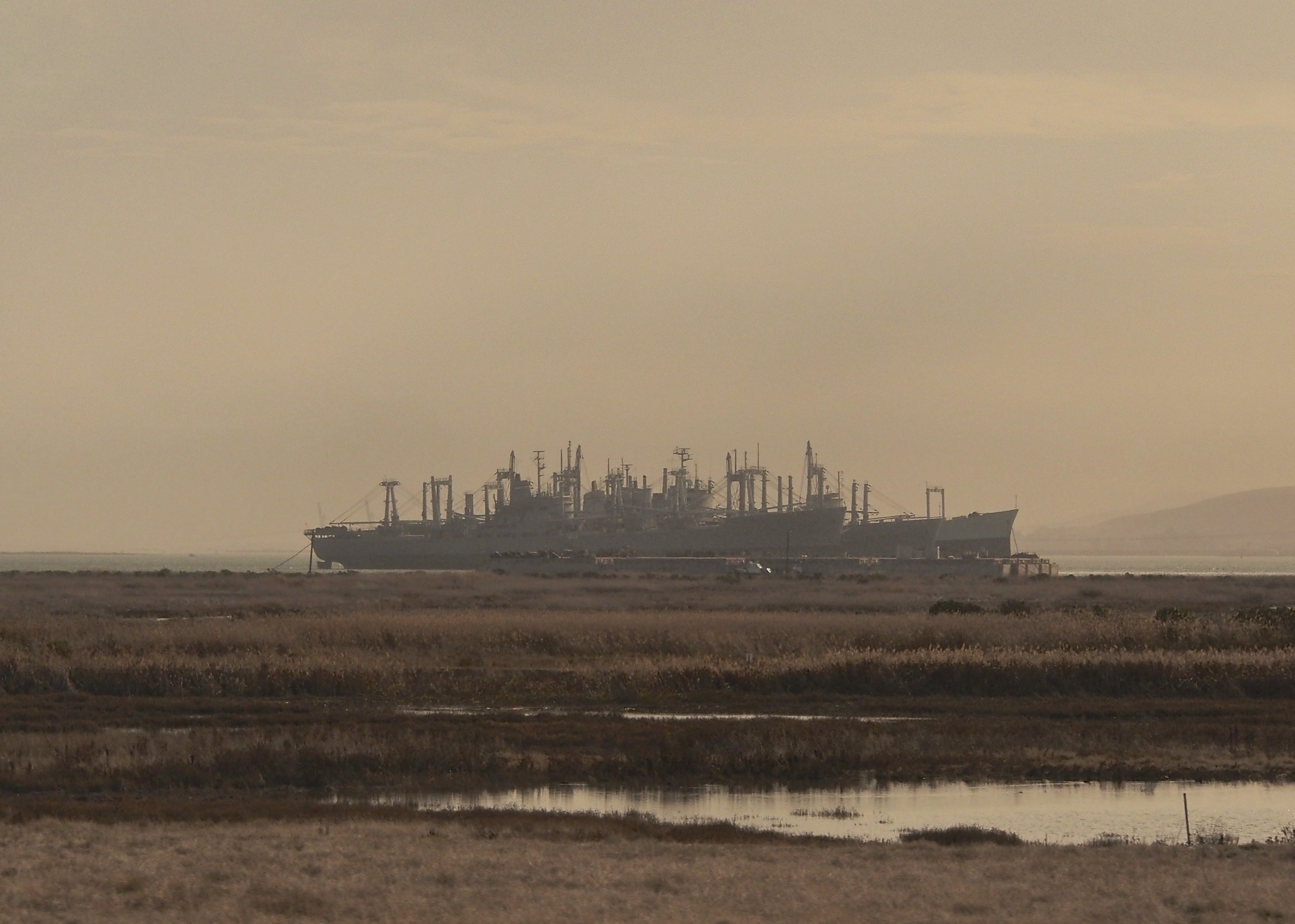
Some US reserve fleet ships at Suisun Bay in 2014

In November 1976, the controlling organization was the Inactive Ship Division of the Naval Ship Systems Command. As of 2011, the controlling organization actually appears to be the Inactive Ships Management Office of the Program Executive Officer – Ships, Naval Sea Systems Command, Portsmouth, Virginia.

Merchant ships held in reserve are managed as part of the separate National Defense Reserve Fleet within MARAD (US Maritime Administration). Several of its sites, such as at Suisun Bay in California, are also used to store regular Navy ships.

=== Maintenance categories ===
Ships placed in the reserve fleets are categorized depending on priority, funding and the planned disposition.

Category B Ships in this category are prioritized over the other categories when it comes to maintenance and funding. They are retained for possible future mobilization and will receive updates and upgrades as funding permits.

Category C These are ships that will be maintained as-is; meaning no updates or improvements unless funding becomes available after that assigned for category B ships has been exhausted.

Category D Temporary state pending planned usage by the Navy, will be maintained as-is.

Category X Ships stricken from the Naval Vessel Register awaiting disposal. Receives no maintenance except ships on donation hold, which undergo dehumidification and cathodic protection.

Category Z This category is for nuclear-powered ships and related support ships pending disposal.

== History ==
Around 1912, the Atlantic Reserve Fleet and the Pacific Reserve Fleet were established as reserve units with still operating ships, but on a greatly reduced schedule.

After the Second World War, with hundreds of ships no longer needed by a peacetime navy, each fleet consisted of a number of groups corresponding to storage sites, each adjacent to a shipyard for easier reactivation. For example, USS Brock (APD-93) was underway for Green Cove Springs, Florida, on 11 April 1946. Brock arrived there on 13 April 1946, and joined the Florida Group, 16th Fleet, which later became the Florida Group, Atlantic Reserve Fleet.

Many of the deactivated World War II merchant vessels were of a class called Liberty ships which were mass-produced ocean-going transports used primarily in the convoys going to/from the U.S., Europe, and Russia. Liberty ships were also used as the navy's support vessels for its fleet of warships and to ferry forces across the Pacific and Atlantic.

Most Liberty ships when deactivated were put into "mothball fleets" strategically located around the coasts of the U.S., or sold into commercial service. They began to be deactivated and scrapped in the early 1970s.

=== Atlantic Reserve Fleet ===
Vice Admirals Herbert F. Leary and Thomas C. Kinkaid served as Commanders, Sixteenth Fleet, after World War II. Sixteenth Fleet later became the Atlantic Reserve Fleet.

The groups of the Atlantic Reserve Fleet were at Boston, Charleston, Green Cove Springs, Florida, New London, MOTBY/New York Harbor, Norfolk, Philadelphia, and Texas.

=== Pacific Reserve Fleet ===
The Nineteenth Fleet became the Pacific Reserve Fleet.

The groups of the Pacific Reserve Fleet were at Alameda, Bremerton, Columbia River, Long Beach, Mare Island, San Diego, San Francisco, Stockton, Tacoma, and Olympia, Washington (Budd Inlet).

== List of current USN reserve fleets ==
=== James River Reserve Fleet ===
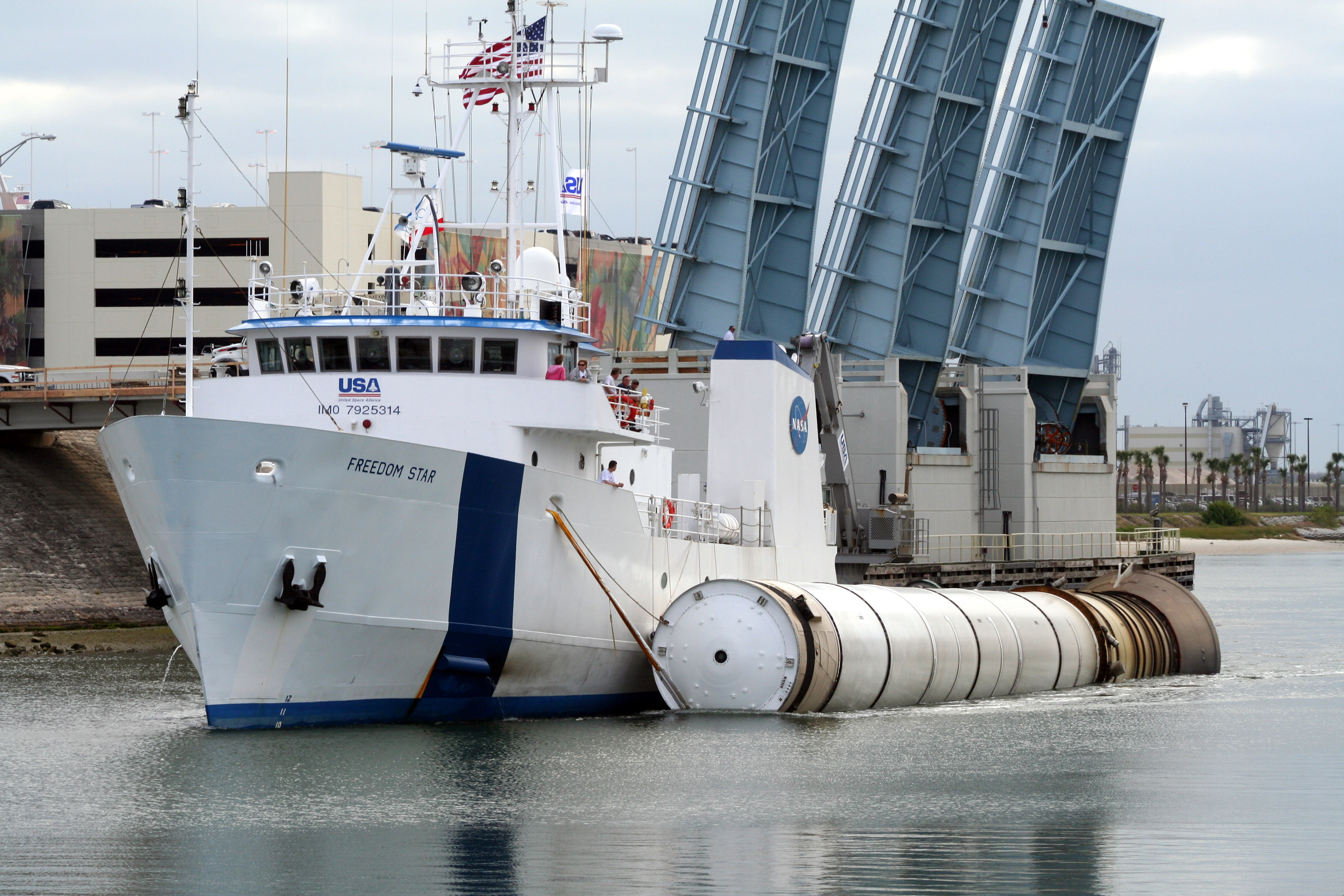
MV Freedom Star returns to port with an SRB after STS-131.

The James River Reserve Fleet consists of a small number of decommissioned U.S. Navy auxiliaries and warships anchored in Virginia's James River near Newport News. The fleet originally comprised approximately 60 ships, most of which were gradually towed away for scrapping. From 2012 to 2016, among its few remaining vessels was MV Freedom Star, previously a NASA recovery ship for the Space Shuttle's solid rocket boosters, which was then loaned out to the Paul Hall Center for Maritime Training and Education in Piney Point, Maryland, as a training vessel. Its sister ship, the Liberty Star, serves as the United States Merchant Marine Academy’s training vessel, the TV Kings Pointer

=== Suisun Bay ===
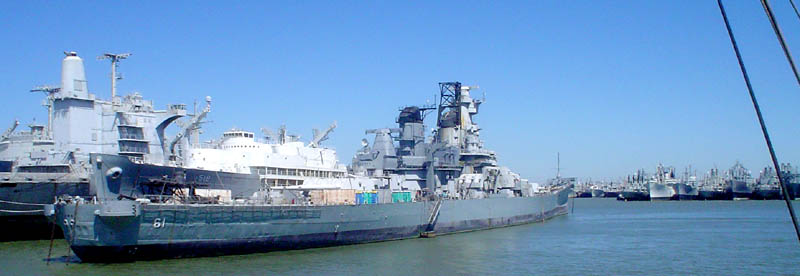
USS Iowa (BB-61) laid up in Suisun Bay (Iowa has since moved to the Port of Los Angeles as a museum ship).

A similar fleet, the National Defense Reserve Fleet, is anchored in Suisun Bay near Benicia, California, and has similarly been reduced. This location is known for hosting the Glomar Explorer after its recovery of portions of Soviet submarine K-129 during the Cold War before its subsequent reactivation as a minerals exploration ship.

=== Beaumont ===
The Beaumont Reserve Fleet, anchored in the Neches River near Beaumont, Texas, contains a number of transport ships.

=== Former fleets ===
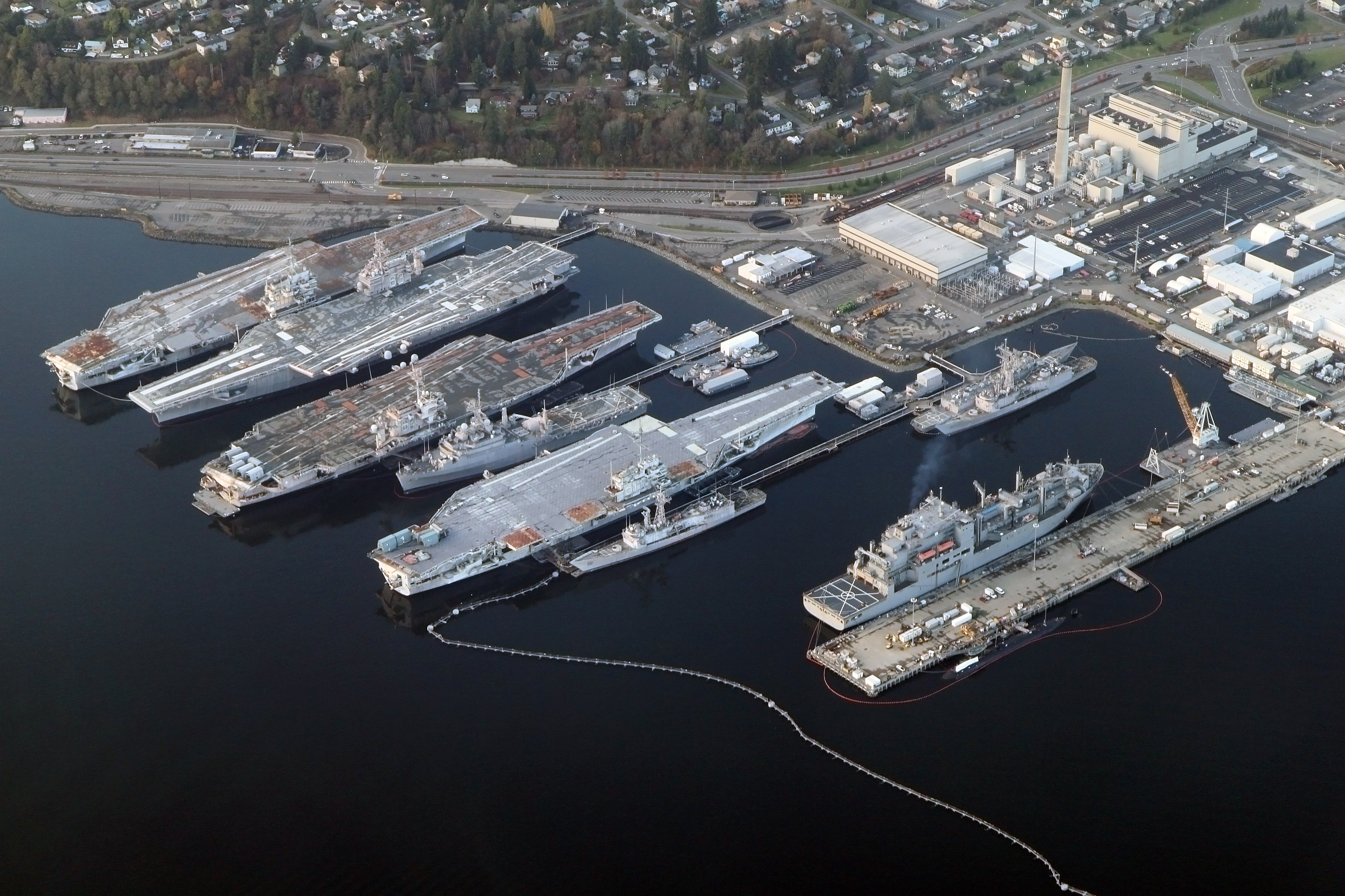
Aircraft carriers stored at the Pacific Reserve Fleet, Bremerton in Bremerton in 2012. From left to right: Independence, Kitty Hawk, Constellation and Ranger.

- Atlantic Reserve Fleet, Boston
- Atlantic Reserve Fleet, Green Cove Springs also called Atlantic Reserve Fleet, Florida
- Atlantic Reserve Fleet, Hudson River
- Atlantic Reserve Fleet, New London
- Atlantic Reserve Fleet, Orange
- Atlantic Reserve Fleet, Wilmington
- Atlantic Reserve Fleet, Norfolk then a NISMF
- Atlantic Reserve Fleet, Charleston
- Atlantic Reserve Fleet, Philadelphia now a NISMF site
- Atlantic Reserve Fleet, New York
- Pacific Reserve Fleet, Astoria also called Pacific Reserve Fleet, Columbia River
- Pacific Reserve Fleet, Stockton
- Pacific Reserve Fleet, Hunters Point
- Pacific Reserve Fleet, Olympia
- Pacific Reserve Fleet, Mare Island
- Pacific Reserve Fleet, Alameda
- Pacific Reserve Fleet, Bremerton
- Pacific Reserve Fleet, San Diego
- Pacific Reserve Fleet, Long Beach
- Pacific Reserve Fleet, Tacoma
- Pacific Reserve Fleet, San Francisco

== Naval Inactive Ship Maintenance Facilities ==
A Naval Inactive Ship Maintenance Facility (NISMF) is a facility owned by the U.S. Navy as a holding facility for decommissioned naval vessels, pending determination of their final fate. All ships in these facilities are inactive, but some are still on the Naval Vessel Register, while others have been struck from that Register.

=== Philadelphia ===
The Philadelphia Naval Inactive Ship Maintenance Facility holds several dozen inactive warships, including the Ticonderoga class cruisers, Oliver Hazard Perry class frigates, and numerous supply ships.

=== Bremerton ===
The Naval Inactive Ship Maintenance Facility at Puget Sound Naval Shipyard, located next to Bremerton, Washington, hosts, among its other ships two dozen decommissioned submarines, several frigates, and numerous supply ships. It is the former home of the nuclear cruiser USS Long Beach, which was scrapped.

=== Pearl Harbor ===
The Naval Inactive Ship Maintenance Facility at Pearl Harbor, Hawaii, holds logistic support ships and amphibious transport dock ships. Several of these ships have served as target ships for Sink Exercises (SINKEX) during Rim of the Pacific (RIMPAC) naval exercises.

== Ready Reserve Force ==
- The Ready Reserve Force (RRF) is a subset of ships in MARAD's National Defense Reserve Fleet (NDRF). Ready Reserve Force supports the rapid worldwide deployment of U.S. military forces.

== See also ==
- 309th Aerospace Maintenance and Regeneration Group, a U.S. Air Force equivalent
