= Olga Mærsk =

Olga Mærsk is the name of three container ships and two tanker operated by the Mærsk line. The Olga Mærsk class of ships is named for the 2003-built ship:

- MS Olga Mærsk (1948) (1948–1979), a 6,591 GRT container ship sold by Mærsk in 1968
- Olga Mærsk (1970) (1970–1995), a 30,039 GRT container ship, subsequently named Asya I (1981–1989), Sunderland (1989–1993), Yellow Island (1993–1995) and Delta Joy (1995–1997)
- Olga Mærsk (1984) (1984–2001), a 14,102 GRT LPG tanker, renamed as Sine Mærsk in 1992 and finally Mærsk Stafford (1993–2001)
- Olga Mærsk (1992–2002), a 27,997 GT tanker originally named Eleo Mærsk (1987–1992). Subsequently named Jacaranda (2002–2004), Tristar Kuwait (2004–2012) and Kuwait (2012–)
- Olga Mærsk (2003) (2003–present), a 34,202 GT container ship, first in the Olga Mærsk class
