= MV Brandanger =

MV Brandanger is the name of the following ships:

- MV Brandanger (1926), sunk on 11 October 1940 by German submarine U-48
- MV Brandanger (1948), a Norwegian cargo ship sold to Bolivia in 1965, scrapped in 2015
