= Pinto Island =

Coordinates: 30°40′27″N 88°1′34″W

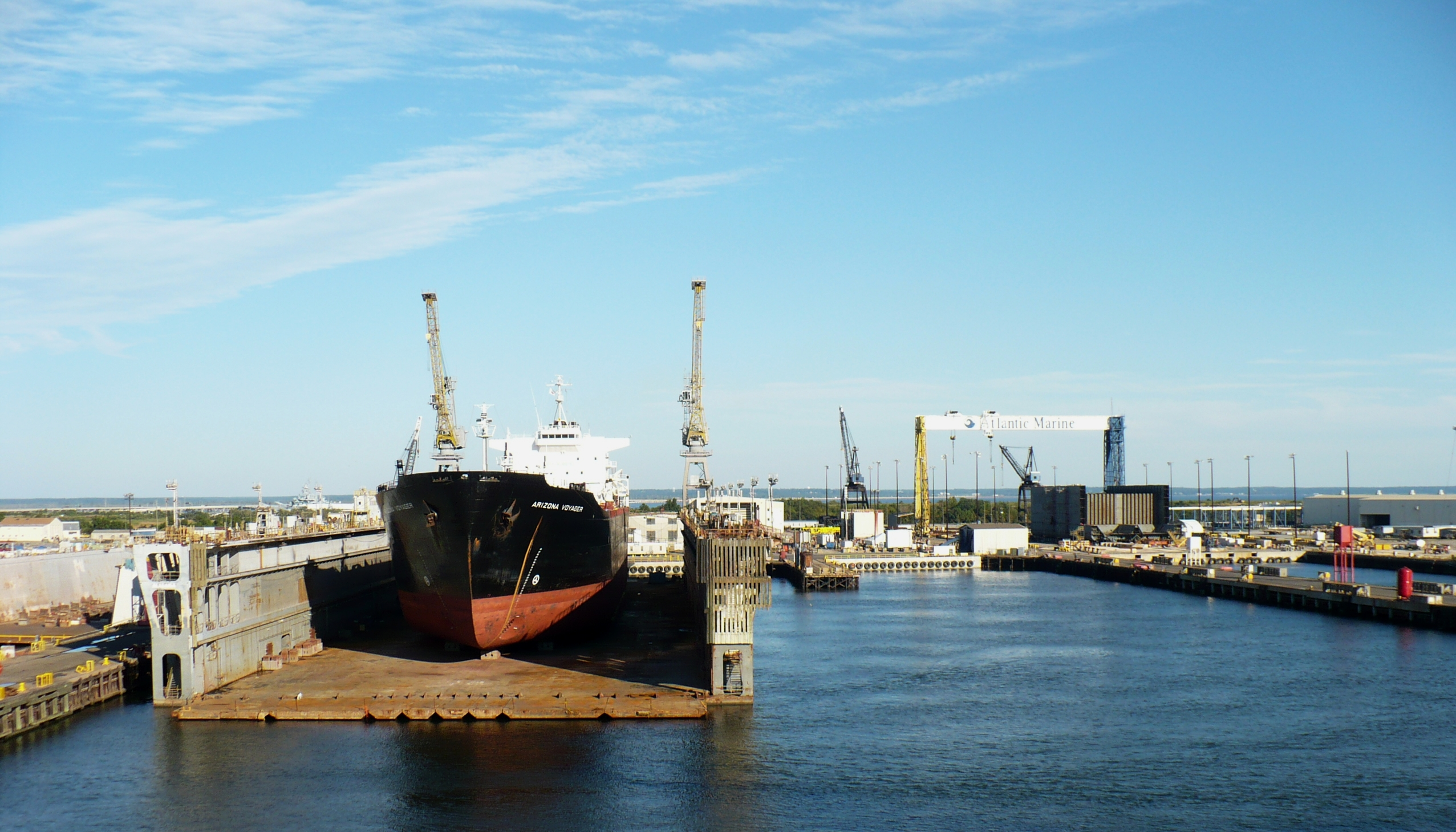
The former Atlantic Marine shipyard, now BAE Systems Southeast Shipyards, on Pinto Island in 2008.

Pinto Island is an island in the U.S. state of Alabama, within the city limits of Mobile. Located on the northwestern coast of Mobile Bay, it is bounded on the west by the Mobile River, on the south by Mobile Bay, on the east by the Spanish River, and on the north by Pinto Pass (now partially infilled with dredged material to form a land bridge) and Blakeley Island. It is dedicated to industrial uses, primarily shipbuilding. The BAE Systems Southeast Shipyards was originally the site of the Alabama Drydock and Shipbuilding Company, and most recently Atlantic Marine, which was acquired by BAE in 2010. The Alabama State Port Authority operates a terminal on the southern end of the island for the ThyssenKrupp steel plant upriver in Calvert. Austal USA owns part of this Island chain taking up most of the central part with a stocking shop channel on the west bank. In June 2018 BAE Systems Southeast completed a total shutdown of all facilities on Pinto Island, selling all their land and ship yards to Austal USA, giving Austal USA 51% control of Pinto Island land area from center to South shore.

The island is approximately .75 miles (1.21 km) at its widest and 1.45 miles (2.33 km) at its longest with an average elevation of 10 feet (3.0 m). It, along with downtown and Blakeley Island, forms District Two of Mobile's city council districts.
