= Atlantic Marine =

- Company type: Private
- Industry: Shipbuilding
- Founded: 1980
- Defunct: 2010
- Fate: Acquired
- Successor: BAE Systems Southeast Shipyards
- Headquarters: Jacksonville, Florida, USA
- Number of locations: 2
- Area served: United States
- Services: Ship conversion, repairs and maintenance, and steel fabrication

Atlantic Marine was an American shipbuilding and construction company. It operated two shipyards, one in Mobile, Alabama and the original corporate location, a smaller one in Jacksonville, Florida where its headquarters was located. It was acquired by BAE Systems in May 2010 for $352 million. BAE Systems renamed the former company BAE Systems Southeast Shipyards, a division of BAE Systems Inc.

As Atlantic Marine Holdings, the company took over the former shipyard of the Alabama Drydock and Shipbuilding Company in 1992. In 2006, the company was itself taken over by an investment firm run by former U.S. Navy Secretary John F. Lehman and became known simply as Atlantic Marine.

The company offered a variety of services, including shipbuilding, ship repairs, maintenance and conversion, and also steel fabrication for industrial uses. The Alabama drydock facility was capable of servicing vessels of up to 46,400 tons, including cargo and cruise ships, and also offered repair and conversion facilities for "drilling rigs and semi-submersibles that served the offshore oil industry."

The Jacksonville drydock serviced vessels of up to 14,600 tons, and specialized in "mega-yacht repairs and refits, as well as commercial and U.S. Navy ship repairs and conversions, marine fabrication, and industrial fabrication and machining."

The company employed 600 full-time workers in 2005.

== Image gallery ==
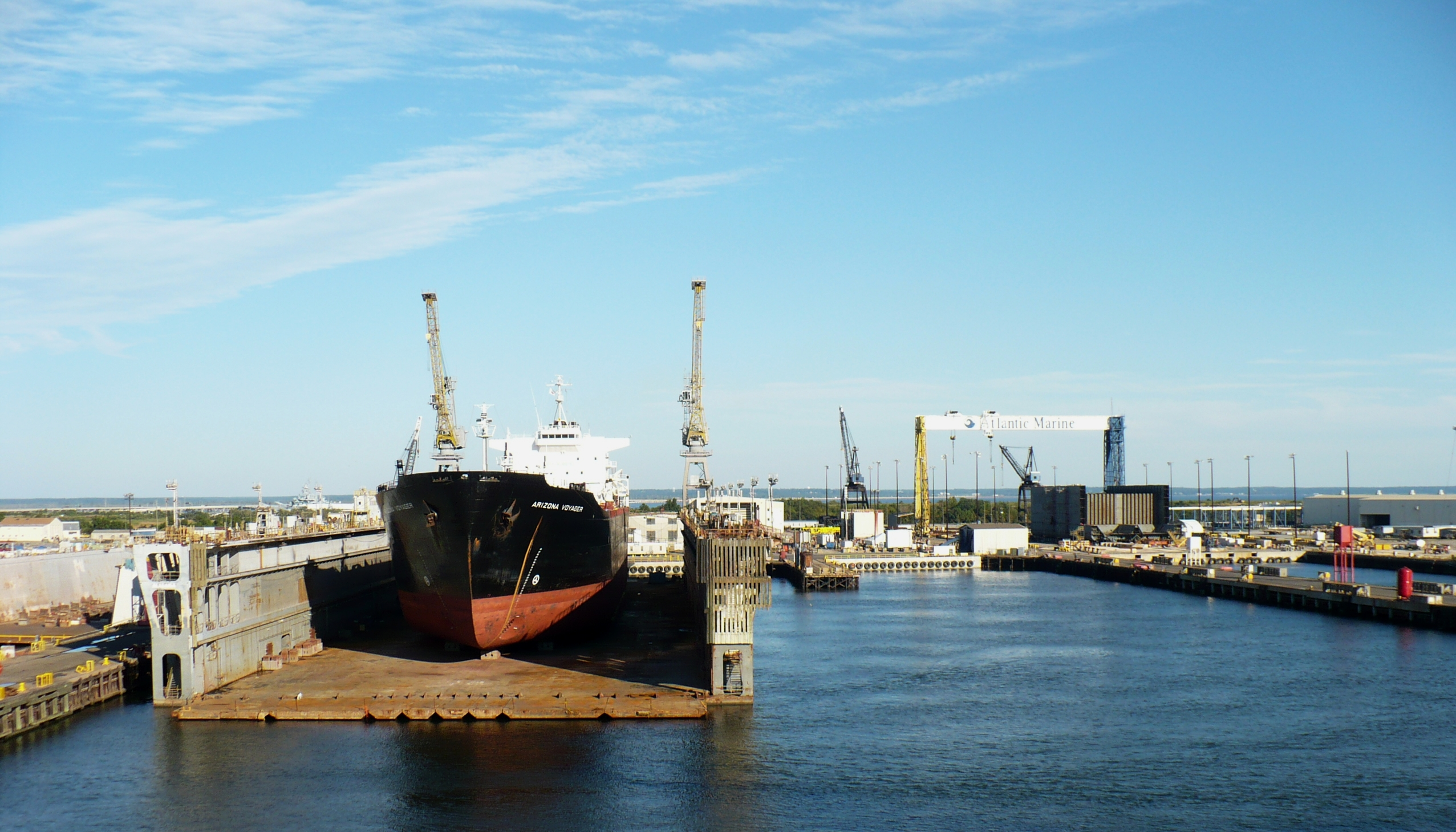
A portion of Atlantic Marine's facilities on Pinto Island in Mobile, Alabama.

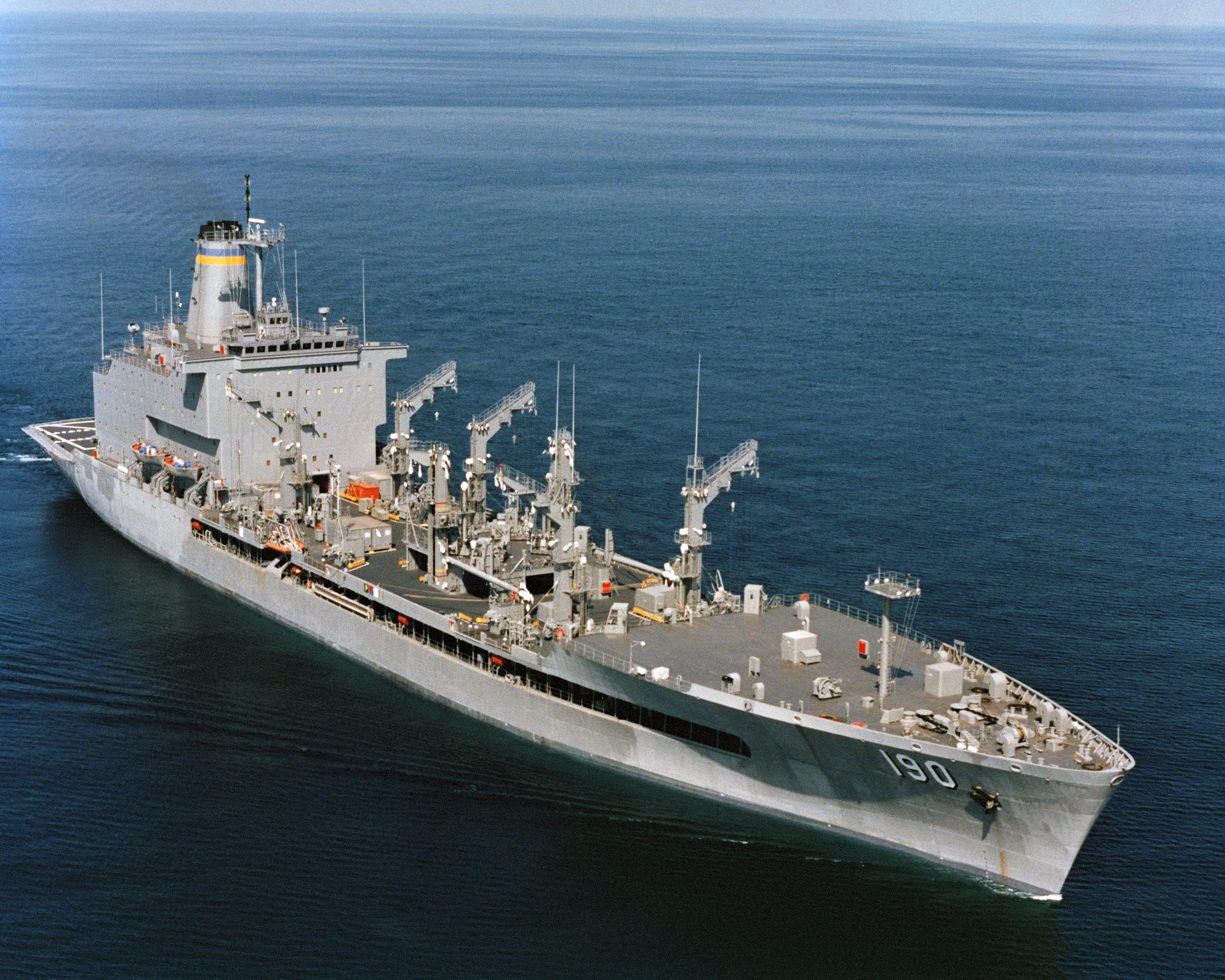
Atlantic Marine completed a refit of the USNS Andrew J. Higgins when it was sold to the Chilean Navy in 2009.

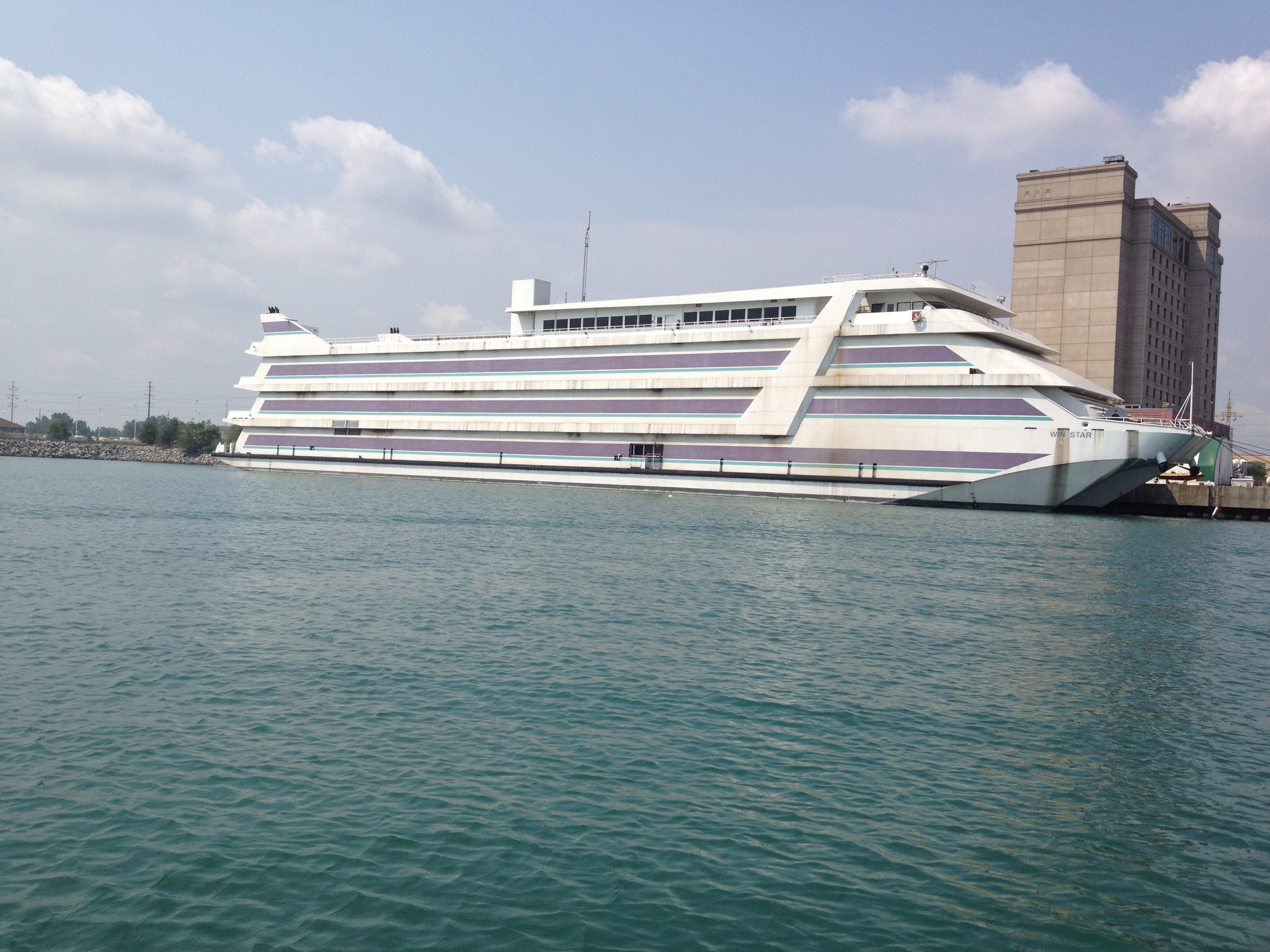
The Win Star was built in 1997 by Atlantic Marine and presently hosts the Ameristar Casino East Chicago.

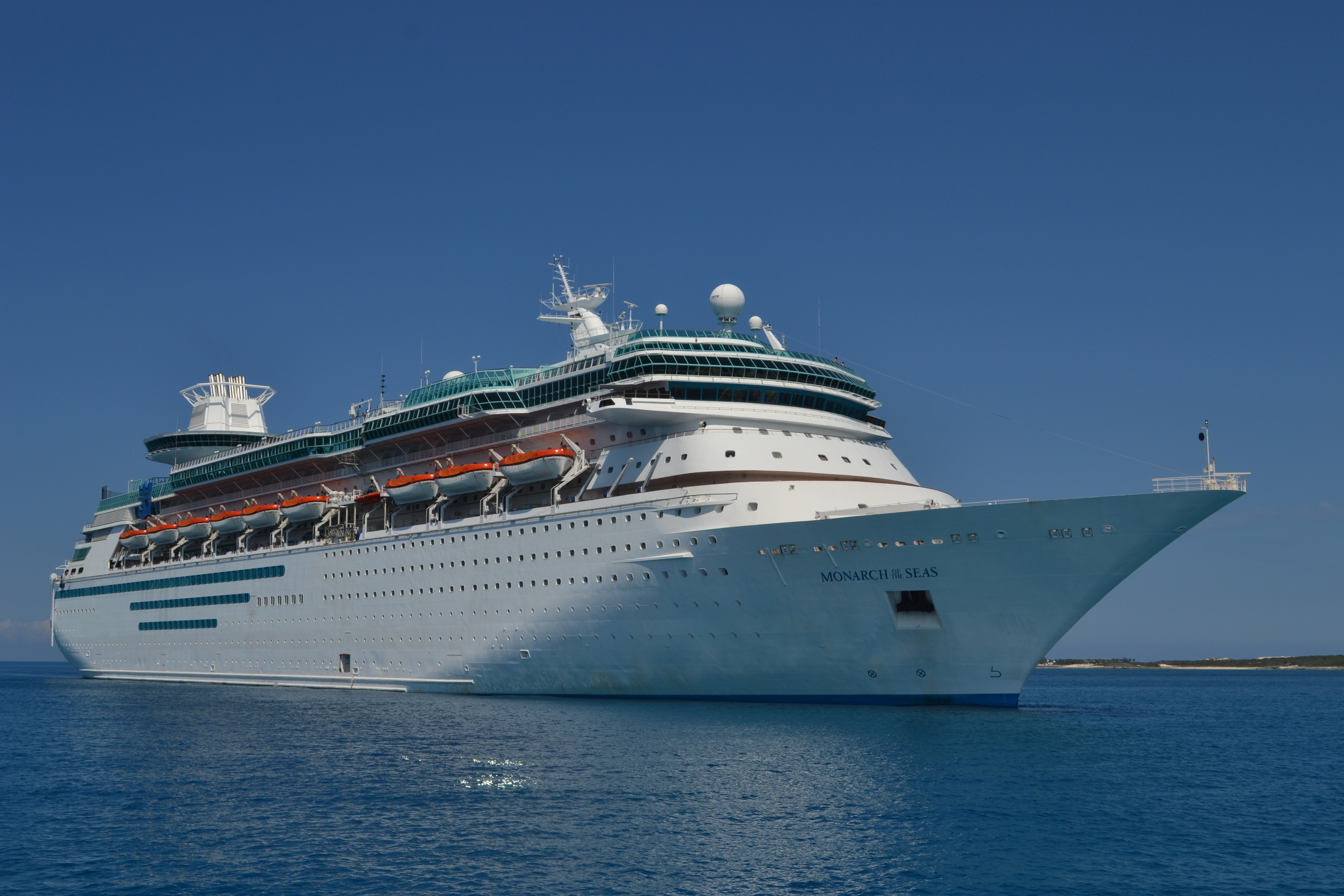
The Monarch of the Seas had extensive repairs completed at Atlantic Marine after it was grounded off St. Maarten on 15 December 1998.

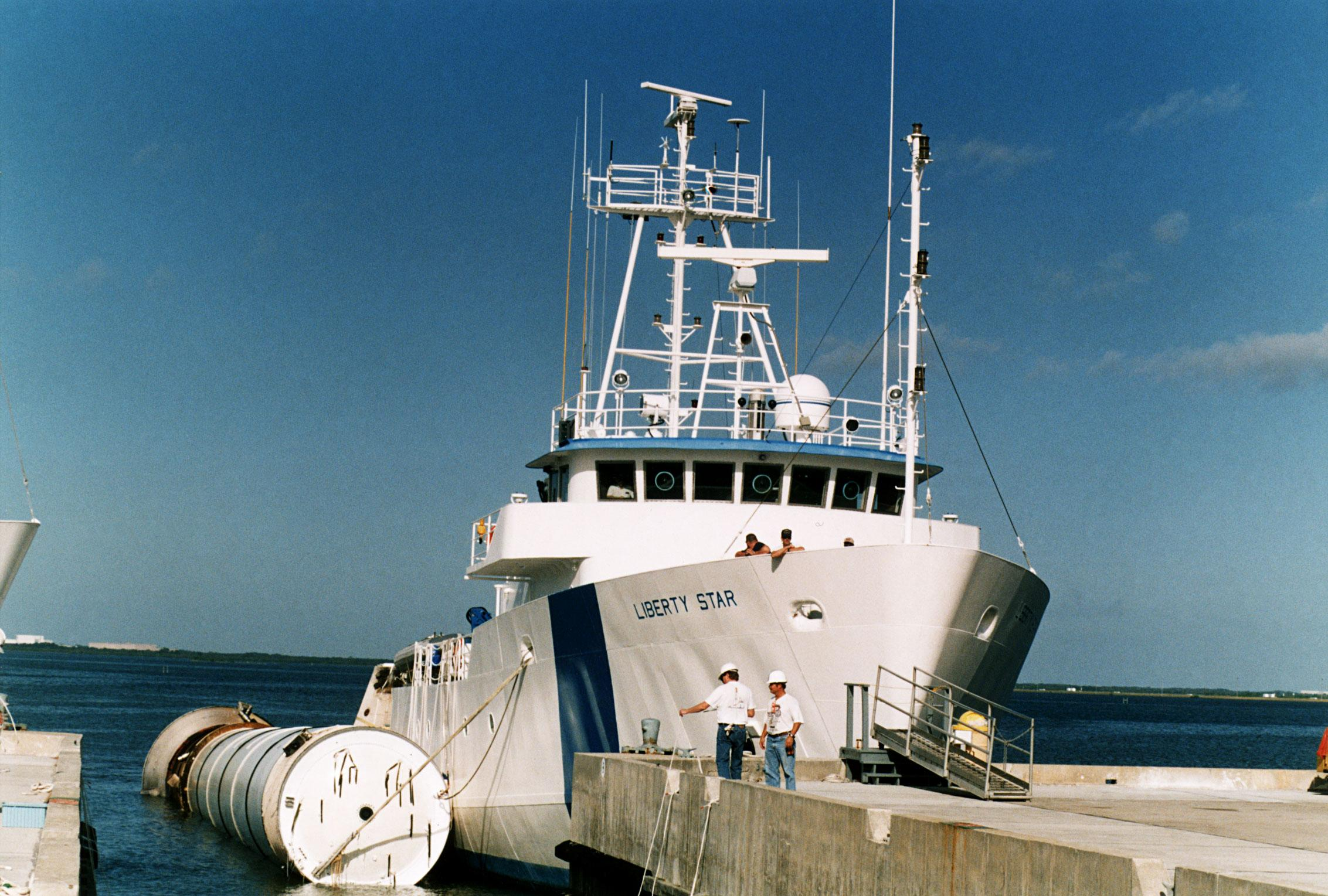
MV Liberty Star, one of two NASA recovery ships built by Atlantic Marine. The two vessels were charged with recovering the Solid Rocket Boosters during Space Shuttle missions.
