= MV Freedom Star =

American recovery ship

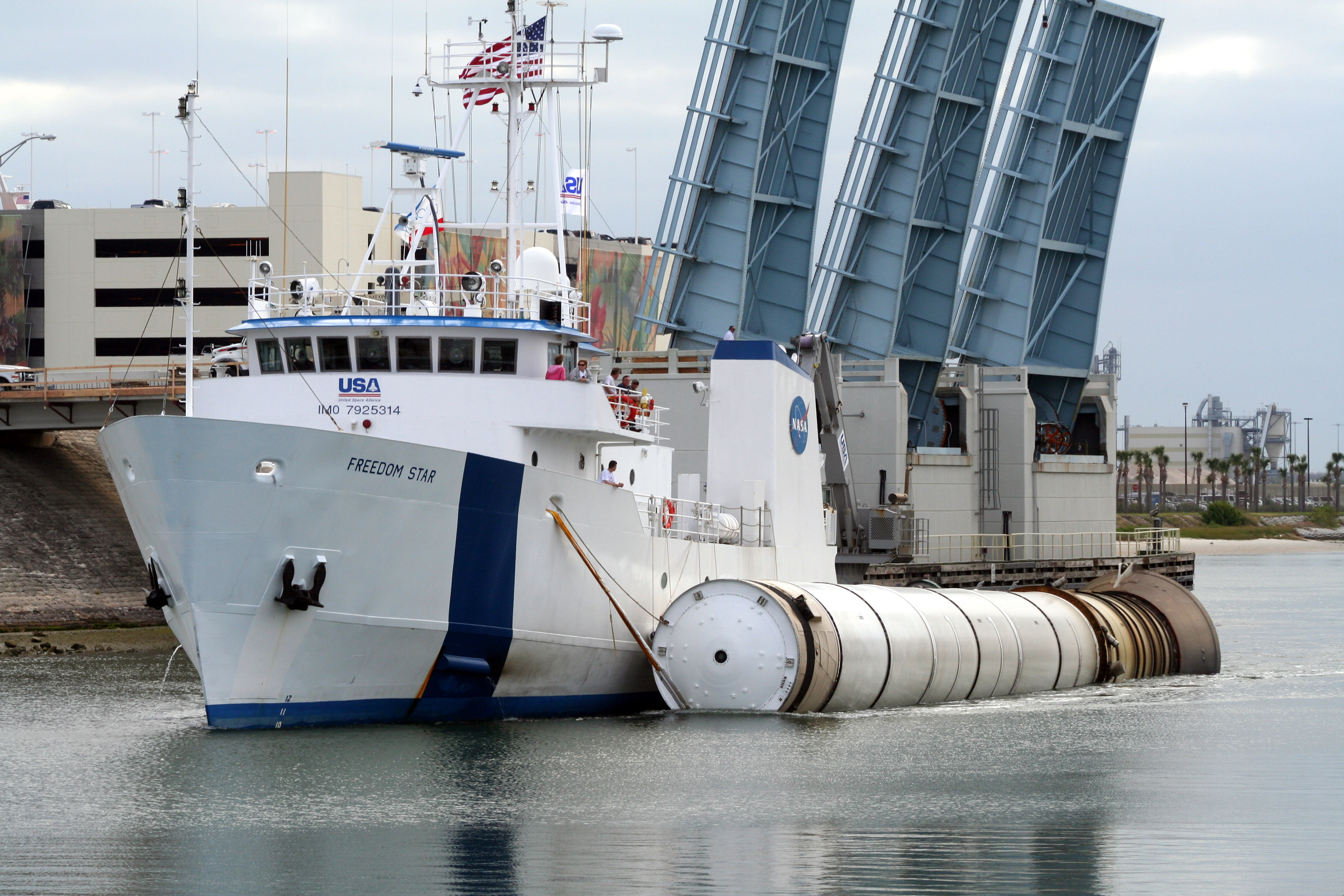
- Freedom Star returns to port with an SRB after STS-131

History

United States
- Name: MV Freedom Star
- Owner: NASA
- Operator: United Space Alliance
- Builder: Atlantic Marine Shipyard, Fort George Island, Florida, U.S.
- Acquired: January 1981
- In service: January 1981
- Out of service: September 28, 2012
- Homeport: Port Canaveral, Florida, U.S.
- Identification: Call sign: KRFB; IMO number: 7925314; MMSI number: 337942424
- Status: Transferred to James River Reserve Fleet

History

United States
- Name: MV Freedom Star
- Owner: U.S. Dept of Transportation
- Operator: U.S. Maritime Administration, James River Reserve Fleet
- Acquired: September 28, 2012
- Homeport: James River, Virginia, U.S.
- Status: Loaned to Paul Hall Center for Maritime Training and Education

History

United States
- Name: MV Freedom Star
- Owner: U.S. Maritime Administration
- Operator: Paul Hall Center for Maritime Training and Education
- Acquired: November 6, 2015
- Reclassified: MV
- Homeport: Piney Point, Maryland, U.S.
- Status: In service

General characteristics
- Tonnage: 484 GT, 743 GRT; 239 NT, 222 NRT
- Displacement: 1,052 short tons (954 t)
- Length: 176 ft (53.6 m)
- Beam: 37 ft (11.3 m)
- Height: 72 ft (21.9 m)
- Draft: 12 ft (3.7 m)
- Depth: 15 ft (4.6 m)
- Installed power: 2 × 223 hp (166 kW) Kato generators
- Propulsion: 2 × 1,450 hp (1,080 kW) GM EMD 12-645E6A diesel engines, driving 2 propellers; 2 × 450 hp (340 kW) Detroit Diesel 8V71 engines, driving bow and stern thrusters
- Speed: 15 kn (28 km/h; 17 mph)
- Range: 6,900 mi (11,100 km)
- Endurance: 30 days
- Capacity: 24 maximum
- Complement: 10 × crew; 9 × retrieval specialists; 1 × retrieval supervisor
- Notes: Towing capacity: 60,000 lb (27,200 kg)

MV Freedom Star is a formerly NASA-owned and United Space Alliance-operated vessel which primarily served as an SRB recovery ship following the launch of Space Shuttle missions. It also performed tugboat duties and acted as a research platform.

From 2012 to 2016, it was a National Defense Reserve Fleet vessel in the James River Reserve Fleet, when it was then loaned by the U.S. Maritime Administration (MARAD) to the Paul Hall Center for Maritime Training and Education in Piney Point, Maryland, for use as a training vessel. Her sister ship is the MV Liberty Star (now TV Kings Pointer).

== History ==
The recovery ships were built at Atlantic Marine Shipyard on Fort George Island, Florida, and delivered in January 1981 to their original owner, United Technologies Corporation. As well as recovering the Space Shuttle's SRBs, Freedom Star has since 1998 been used to tow the Space Shuttle external fuel tanks from their assembly plant at Michoud Assembly Facility near New Orleans, Louisiana, to the Vehicle Assembly Building at the Kennedy Space Center in Florida. She served a similar role in recovering the first test flight of the Ares I and was anticipated to continue recovering boosters for the Constellation program before it was canceled in 2010.

Freedom Star underwent special strengthening enhancements to withstand the greater burden of towing the external fuel tanks. The stern was strengthened at critical points, new bulwark fairings were added, and an H-bitt was installed through which cabling is threaded to keep it centered during towing operations. Also installed was a hydraulic towing winch, referred to as a double-drum waterfall winch, holding 2,000 feet (610 m) or more of wire rope on each drum. One drum supports booster retrievals while the other is devoted to external tank towing.

Freedom Star had been used to support scientific research operations including research for the National Oceanic and Atmospheric Administration and several universities. She was usually docked alongside her sister at the Solid Rocket Booster processing facility at the Cape Canaveral Space Force Station in Florida.

Each ship is propelled by two main engines providing a total of 2,900 horsepower. The main engines turn two seven-foot (2.1-meter) propellers with controllable pitch, which provides greater response time and maneuverability. The ships also are equipped with two thrusters. The stern thruster is a water jet system that allows the ship to move in any direction without the use of propellers. This system was installed to protect the endangered manatee population that inhabits regions of the Banana River where the ships are based. The system also allows divers to work near the ship during operations at a greatly reduced risk.

In April 2012, NASA used Freedom Star to track a commercial orbital spaceflight by a Falcon 9 launch vehicle flown to the International Space Station by their space transport contractor SpaceX.

=== Transfer ===
On September 28, 2012, Freedom Star was transferred to the U.S. Department of Transportation's James River Reserve Fleet for potential use as a training vessel.

On November 6, 2015, USNS Freedom Star arrived at the Piney Point, Maryland-based maritime training school to become the Paul Hall Center's training vessel, on loan from MARAD's James River Reserve Fleet in Jamestown, Virginia. At the school, the Freedom Star replaces the Osprey, a yard patrol type vessel that served as the school's training platform from 1996 to 2009.
