= Alabama Drydock and Shipbuilding Company =

Former marine production facility in the United States of America

Coordinates: 30.67537°N 88.03186°W

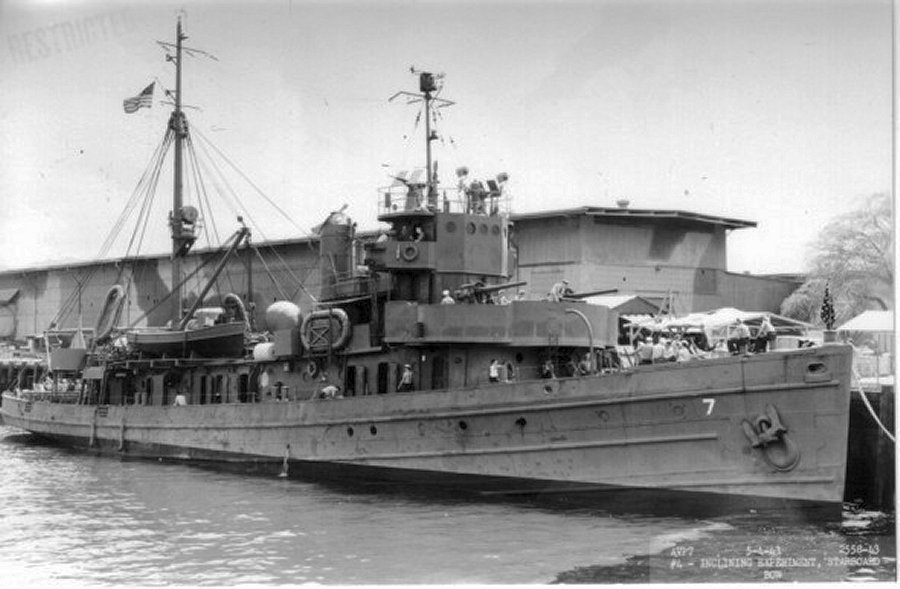
USS Swan, one of three minesweepers produced for the United States Navy in 1919.

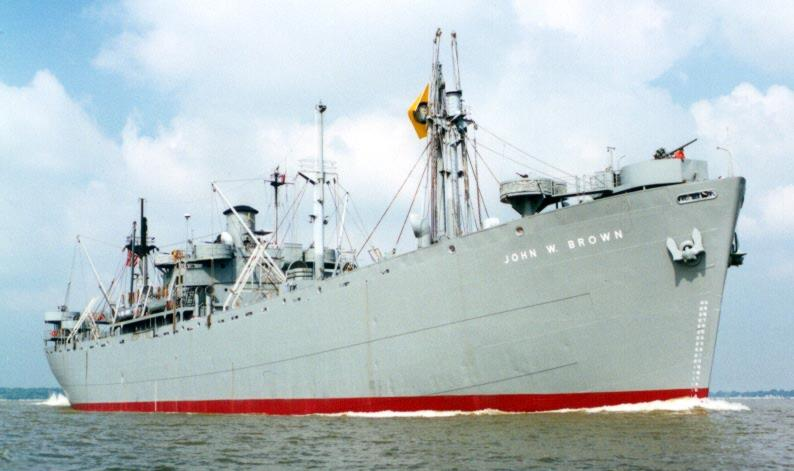
20 Liberty ships were produced at the yard from 1942 to 1943.

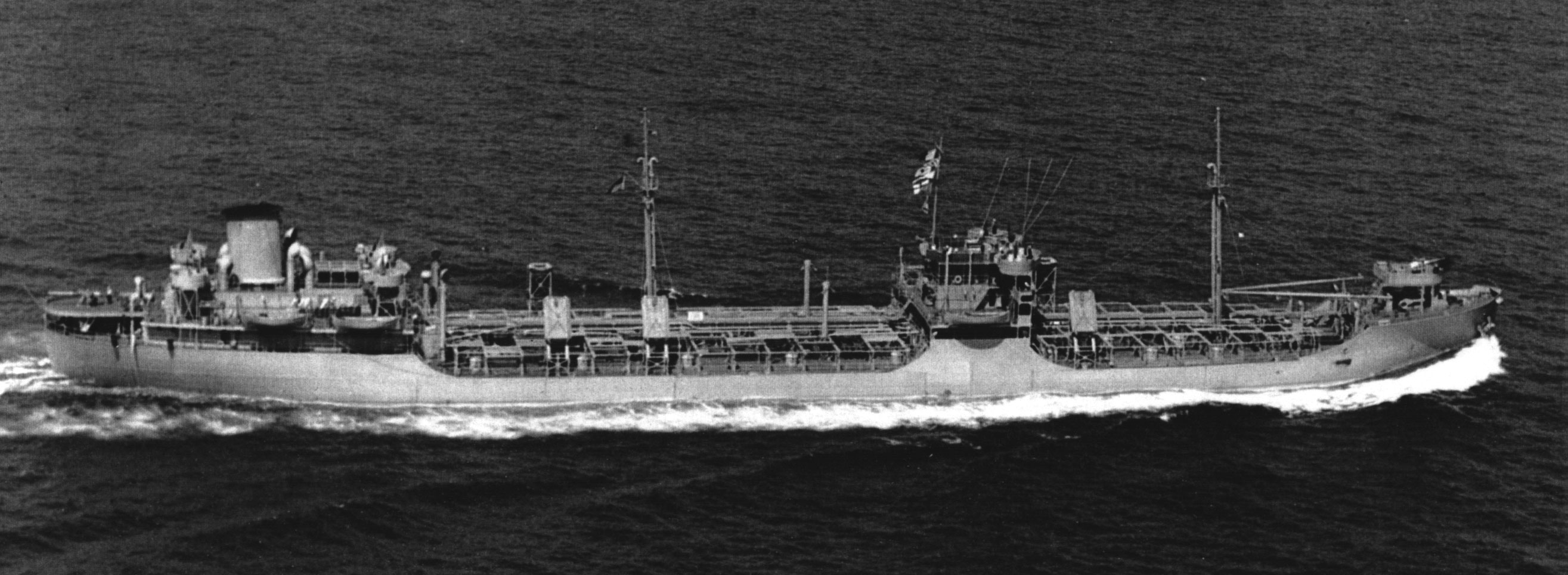
102 T2 tankers were produced from 1943 to 1945.

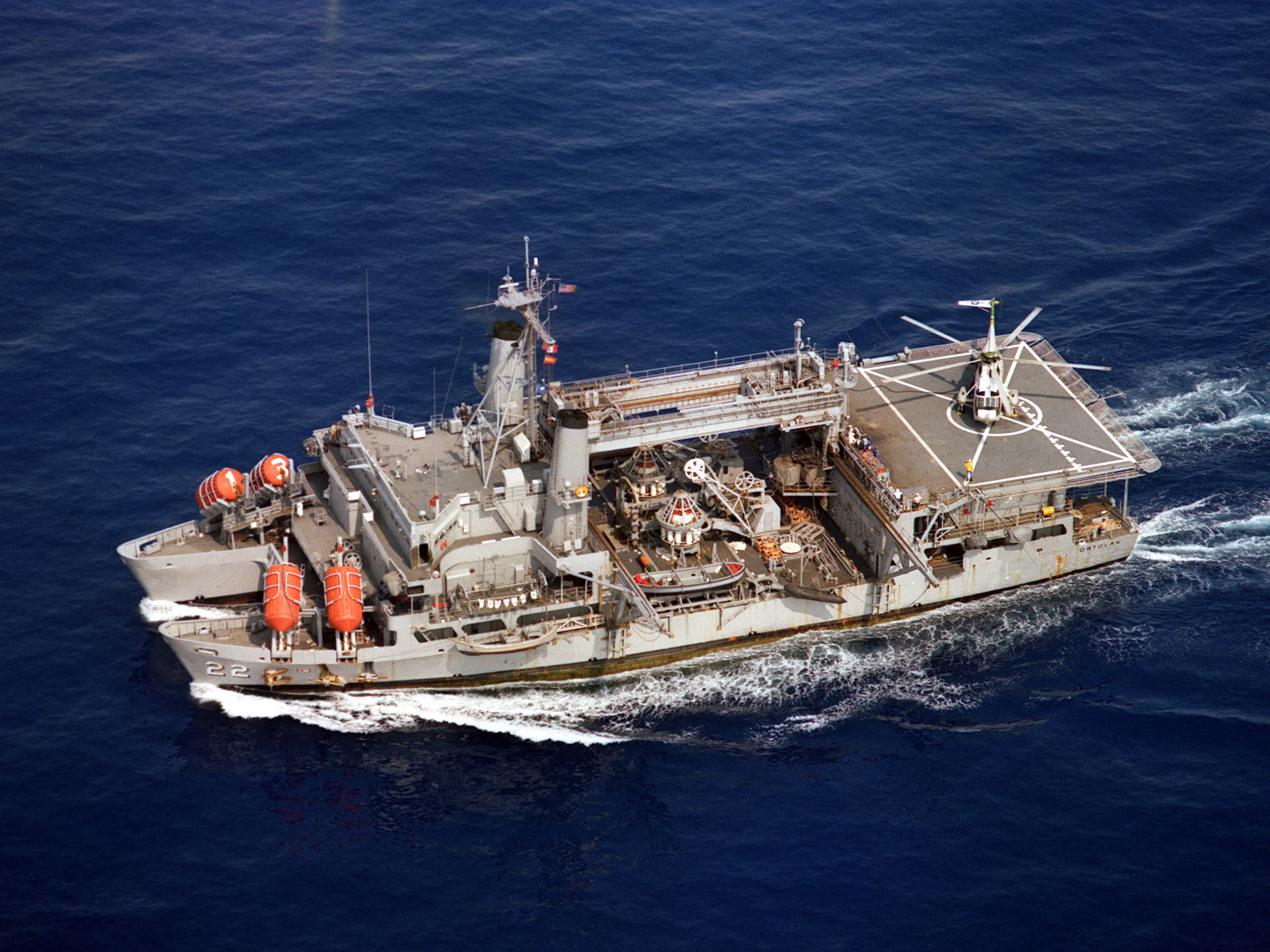
USS Ortolan, one of two twin-hulled submarine rescue ships produced in 1969.

The Alabama Drydock and Shipbuilding Company (ADDSCO) located in Mobile, Alabama, was one of the largest marine production facilities in the United States during the 20th century. It began operation in 1917, and expanded dramatically during World War II; with 30,000 workers, including numerous African Americans and women, it became the largest employer in the southern part of the state. During the defense buildup, which included other shipyards, Mobile became the second-largest city in the state, after Birmingham.

Shipbuilding declined in the United States in the later 20th century, and ADDSCO closed its yard in the mid-1970s. It later re-opened. ADDSCO is now owned by BAE Systems, which purchased the yard from Atlantic Marine in May 2010. BAE Systems closed the yard in 2018 and it was reestablished as Alabama Shipyard in 2019.

== World War II ==
During and after World War II, ADDSCO became the largest employer in southern Alabama, building Liberty ships, tankers and other vessels from the keel up, often at rapid speeds during the stateside war effort. The first yard was built on Pinto Island in Mobile Bay. During World War II, the facility was primarily tasked for production of the Liberty ships, but wartime losses caused a shift to repair of tanker vessels. Twenty Liberty ships were produced at Mobile. From 1943 to 1945, 102 T2 tanker ships were produced at ADDSCO.

Gulf Shipbuilding's destroyer and cargo ship facility was located a few miles upstream.

== Employment expansion ==
Thousands made their way to Mobile to find work. By 1943 some 18,500 men were employed at ADDSCO, including 6,000 African Americans. White hostility to the African Americans being promoted to welder positions resulted in a white riot starting the evening of May 24, 1943. An estimated 4,000 white workers at the shipyard attacked black workers; others threw bricks at black housing in the city. The governor ordered National Guard troops to protect the workers. In order to settle the riot, federal, city, union and NAACP leaders agreed to four segregated shipways, where African Americans could occupy all positions. Those employed in these highly skilled jobs earned wages equal to the white defense workers and had the chance to have equally skilled positions.

Achieving racial equality continued to be a problem at the shipyard following the war. Legal segregation of facilities in the state did not end until the late 1960s, although federal defense contractors were not supposed to practice segregation. Although racial tensions were addressed repeatedly by both management and trade unions, a small race riot erupted and forced temporary closing of the yard.

== Recent years ==
In the mid-1970s, the Mobile yard closed due to declining business and labor unrest. The facility later re-opened and remains in operation today. The ship repair subsidiary of ADDSCO closed in September 1988.

A portion of the facility was leased to Atlantic Marine in March 1989, which acquired the site outright in December 1992. The investment company, headed by former U.S. Navy Secretary John Lehman, operated the yard from 2006 until 2010. It was acquired by BAE Systems in May 2010, which continues to operate it as a full service shipyard, BAE Systems Southeast Shipyards.

On March 1, 2018, the parent company for the shipyard, BAE Systems, announced it was going to close the yard permanently when all ongoing projects there were completed. On June 18, 2019, Alabama Shipyard became owner of the shipyard and has managed to dramatically improve the facility's economic outlook. Alabama Shipyard currently operates as a major ship maintenance, overhaul, repair, and conversion contractor for the Departments of Defense and Transportation, and also provides ship disposal services to an array of customers. Alabama Shipyard serves as the largest shipyard in Mobile, Alabama.

== The riots and the aftermath ==
The Alabama Dry Dock was located in Mobile, Alabama, and was the home of Alabama Drydock and Shipbuilding Company (ADDSCO). ADDSCO was the largest employer in Mobile during World War II, building and maintaining all U.S. Navy ships for both World War I and World War II. In 1941, during World War II, ADDSCO started hiring African Americas for unskilled positions. Before the war, Mobile was an empty rural town but in the late 1930s military materials started to be produced in Mobile. This allowed the town to exponentially grow but Mobile was not ready for this growth. There was a lack of housing causing beds to be rented by day workers at night and then by night workers during the day. By 1943 they had hired 7,000 African American men and women making up about 14 percent of their shipyard workers. All of these workers worked as unskilled workers while whites held skilled positions such as welders. Until the spring of 1943, when twelve of these African American workers were promoted to skilled positions of welders.

These promotions changed the Alabama dry docks forever, they were made following directives from President Roosevelt's Fair Employment Practices Committee ordering the elevation of African Americans to skilled positions. This had been pushed for years by the NAACP and by local Black leaders, however, even after being ordered by the committee, ADDSCO was still reluctant to do it. Before this day the job of a welder was only held by white employees. Mobile was previously a place where whites and African Americans could live together, however, as soon as the status quo was threatened whites revolted. Gray said, "But when blacks began to get homes, to buy homes, and to ride in big cars, it turned some people off." Angry with the promotion of these twelve African American workers threatening the status quo around 4,000 white shipyard workers and community members waited for them to finish their first shift. When they finished their shift at Pinto Island, they were met by a mob of white shipyard workers who were armed with clubs, pipes, and many other dangerous weapons. They attacked any African American worker they could find, throwing two of them into the Mobile River. They were met by other African American workers who jumped in to avoid the mobs.

Governor Chauncey Sparks at Montgomery ordered all liquor and beer outlets to be closed in Mobile and Baldwin Counties until order was restored. In order for order to be restored “all available law enforcement officers, supplemented by a detachment of soldiers” including the National Guard were brought out. The mobs did not kill anyone; however, they did injure more than 50 people. All African American workers at the plant were sent home even after the situation was “under control” and some were ordered by the company to leave the job. It took several weeks before the African American workers could return to work again safely. Gray said, “Because there would be a bunch standing outside and they would have their cars parked. And in their cars, they'd have monkey wrenches and tire irons and stuff like that.” All of this violence lead to segregated shipways.

After the incident at the dry docks, tension between the workers was still high. It took a long time for the white workers to begin their work again because they did not want to work beside African Americans. The company, in response to the white workers complaints, created four separate shipways where blacks were free to hold every kind of position - except foreman. This led to a more segregated workplace for African Americans because they were forced to work in black only shipways. Although some African Americans were promoted to skilled labor jobs, the majority of Americans were stuck working the same unskilled and low paying jobs that they were before the riot. After the Alabama dry dock riots, racism and segregation was still extremely prevalent in Mobile Alabama. Although Mobile has always prided themselves on being a community of equality, the recent occurrence on the dock proved otherwise. Newspaper articles touch on how the riot plays right into the hands of Hitler. The newspaper explained that Hitler boasts in his book, Mein Kamps, that he can completely disrupt America's industrial production, and he can if Americans allow their passions to become prey to the insidious poison of racial hatreds. The overall aftermath of the riot created more tension and segregation within the Mobile Alabama society.

When the war ended, African American veterans who were fighting for freedom overseas, came back to the same segregation they were facing before they left for war. This caused great anger among the African American community because they risked their lives in the fight for freedom, to return to their home country where they are not treated with equality. On the first day when African Americans returned to work, a meeting was held to discuss the many pleas of the African American workers. Many of the workers requested for a release of their war frozen jobs on the docks, but they were treated the applications as if they were from the week prior. African Americans were seeking a release from their jobs on the docks, and were not given the proper treatment from the area director for the war manpower commission. Segregation was still prevalent in the dry docks after the riot, the segregation was influenced and granted through the commissioners at the dry docks which allowed for violent behavior to break out between workers on the dry docks.

The actions which occurred in Mobile Alabama sparked a whole bunch of racial confrontations in industrial areas all over the country. Some of the towns included Springfield Massachusetts, Newark New Jersey, and Detroit where 34 were killed and 200 people were wounded. After seeing what had occurred in the Alabama dry docks, it sparked anger among the whole country. The committee of racial equality started to advocate for the desegregation of restaurants, bus lines, and theatres. Through all this violence, life was starting to change for African Americans. Membership in the NAACP increased nine-fold. American citizens, especially African Americans were starting to take notice of the inequality they have been facing throughout the country, which led them to become involved in seeking equality. The Pittsburg courier even campaigned for a double victory over the enemies of freedom at home, as well as overseas.
