= NASA recovery ship =

Ships for retrieving spent rocket boosters

Coordinates: 28.4892°N 80.5894°W

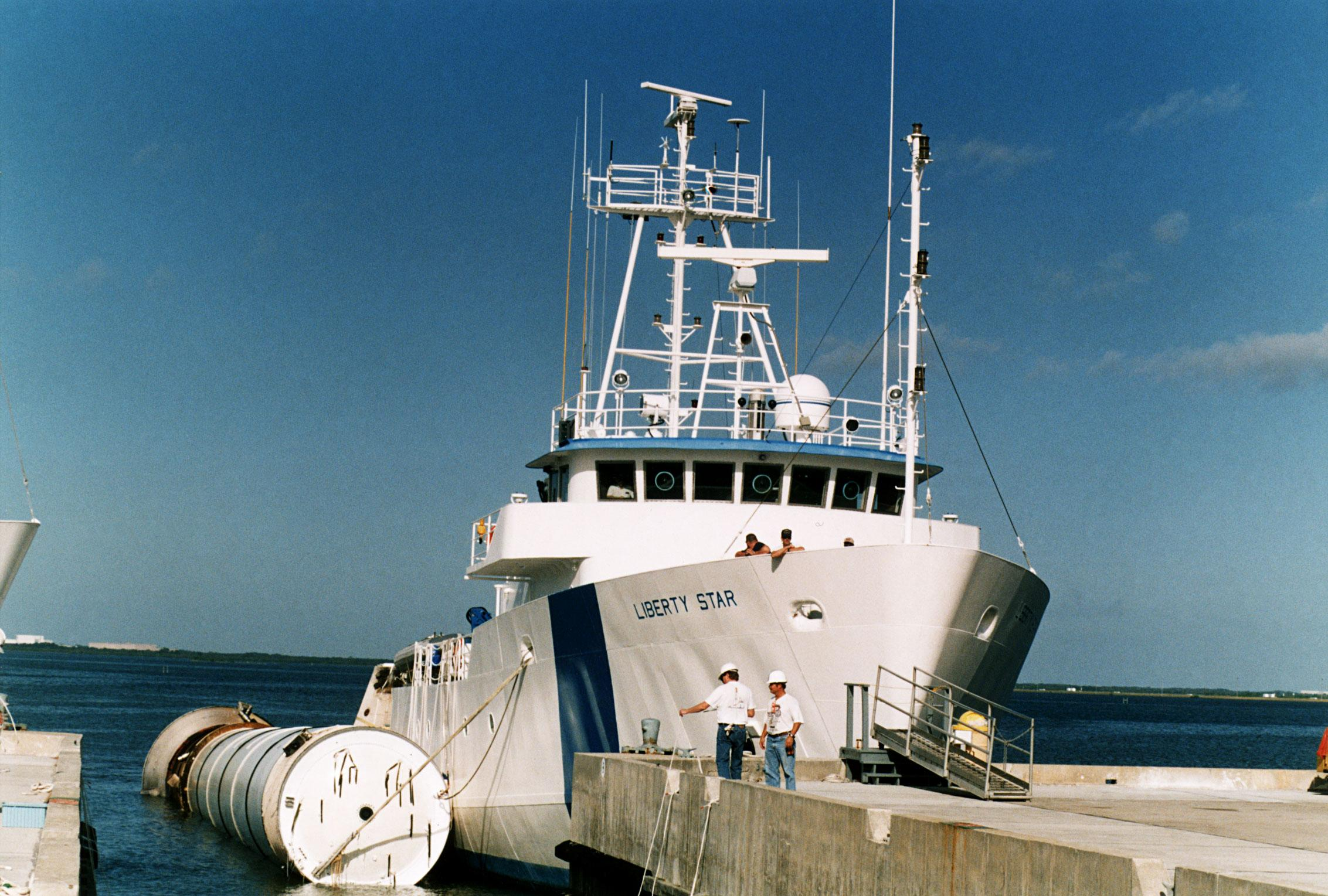
- Liberty Star with SRB after STS-87

Class overview
- Builders: Atlantic Marine Shipyard, Fort George Island nr. Jacksonville, Florida
- Operators: United Space Alliance
- Built: 1980–1981
- In commission: 1981–present
- Planned: 2
- Active: 2

General characteristics
- Type: SRB recovery ship
- Length: 176 ft (54 m)
- Beam: 37 ft (11 m)
- Draft: 12 ft (3.7 m)
- Propulsion: 2 × diesel engines, 2,900 hp (2,163 kW); 2 × auxiliary engines
- Speed: 15 knots (28 km/h; 17 mph)
- Range: 6,000 miles (9,700 km)
- Boats & landing craft carried: Two small boats
- Capacity: 1 rocket booster
- Complement: Up to 24; Normally 10 crew + 9 SRB retrieval team, retrieval supervisor and observers
- Notes: Towing capacity: 60,000 pounds (27,000 kg)

The NASA recovery ships are two ships, the MV Liberty Star and the MV Freedom Star, that were tasked with retrieving spent Solid Rocket Boosters (SRBs) following the launch of Space Shuttle missions. Although owned by NASA, the ships were operated by Space Flight Operations contractor United Space Alliance. Following the end of the Space Shuttle program, and therefore booster recovery, NASA transferred both vessels to the Department of Transportation.

== Design and construction ==
Both ships were built at Atlantic Marine Shipyard on Fort George Island, Florida, and delivered in January 1981 to their original owner, United Technologies Inc. They are propelled by two main engines providing a total of 2,900 horsepower (2.2 MW), and are capable of towing 60,000 pounds (27,000 kg) each. Two auxiliary engines with Jacuzzi-like jets (similar to those found in Naval riverine craft) as well as the extra caution taken by the crew allow the ships to coast up the Banana River without harming the significant manatee population.

All gear on deck, including the 7,500-pound (3,400 kg) deck crane used to lift the booster frustum on deck, compressors for removing seawater from the boosters, winches and reels, bolt on and off to allow the vessels to be used for purposes other than booster recovery such as towing the Pegasus barge from Michoud Assembly Facility.

Communications equipment includes a Kongsberg dynamic position system and joy stick control, X-band and S-band radars for tracking ship traffic and the falling SRBs, global positioning system, handheld VHF radios and GPS units, digital video and recording systems, voice and data satellite communication capability, VHF automatic direction finding, high-frequency single-side band radios, electronic chart plotters, night vision and Sea Area-3 Global Maritime Distress Safety System consoles. To satisfy NASA's need for more observational data during shuttle launches, a Weibel Scientific Continuous Pulse Doppler X-band radar was mounted on MV Liberty Star to provide velocity and motion information about the shuttle and any debris during launch.

== Activities ==
Aside from their usual missions of retrieving the Space Shuttle SRBs, the Liberty Star and Freedom Star have occasionally been used for other purposes. Starting in 1998, the ships began making use of their downtime between Shuttle launches by towing the Space Shuttle external fuel tanks from their assembly plant at Michoud Assembly Facility in New Orleans, Louisiana to the Vehicle Assembly Building at the Kennedy Space Center in Florida. The ships performed similar missions when the Ares 1-X rocket was tested.

To withstand the towing burden, Liberty Star and Freedom Star underwent deck-strengthening enhancements. The sterns were strengthened at critical points, new bulwark fairings were added, and an H-bitt was installed through which cabling is threaded to keep it centered during towing operations. A hydraulic towing winch was also installed, referred to as a double-drum waterfall winch, holding 2,000 feet or more of wire rope on each drum. One drum supports booster retrievals while the other is devoted to external tank towing.

The ships have also occasionally been used to support scientific research operations including research for the National Oceanic and Atmospheric Administration and several universities. The ships are normally docked alongside each other next to the Solid Rocket Booster processing facility at the Cape Canaveral Space Force Station in Florida.

External videos
- HD video of SRB recovery operations of both ships after the launch of STS-133 on YouTube
- The Freedom Star passing through the Port Canaveral locks on YouTube
