= Olga Mærsk (2003) =

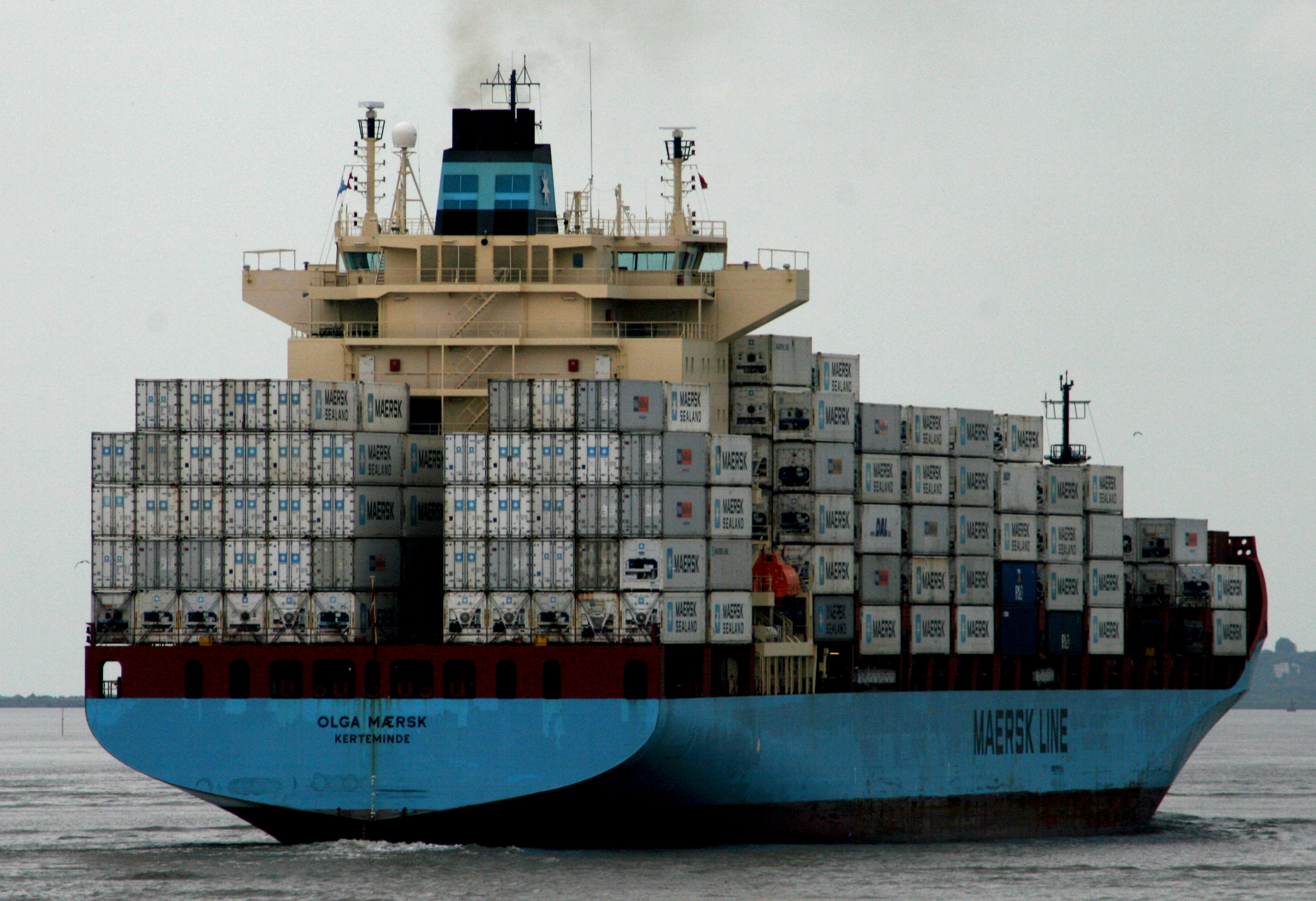
- Olga Mærsk outbound from Tilbury Docks.

History
- Name: Olga Mærsk
- Owner: Maersk Line
- Operator: Maersk Line
- Port of registry: (Denmark) Kerteminde
- Launched: 10 March 2003
- Completed: 26 May 2003
- Identification: IMO number: 9251614; MMSI number: 220198000; Call sign: OXBB2
- Status: in active service

General characteristics
- Class & type: Olga Mærsk class
- Type: Container ship
- Tonnage: 34,202 GT; 41,028 DWT
- Length: 237 metres (778 ft)
- Beam: 32.2 metres (106 ft)
- Draught: 12.25 metres (40.2 ft)
- Capacity: 3267 TEU

Olga Mærsk is a container ship, built in 2003 and operated by Maersk Line. it is the first in the Olga Mærsk class, other Mærsk ships in the Olga Mærsk class are Olivia Mærsk, Oluf Mærsk and Gorm Mærsk.
