= MS Olga Mærsk (1948) =

Danish cargo ship

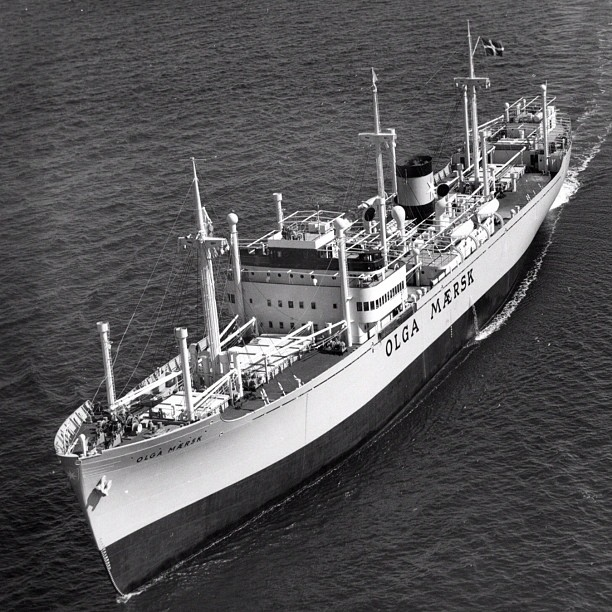
- Olga Maersk as it left the shipyard in 1949

History

Denmark
- Name: Olga Maersk
- Port of registry: Copenhagen, Denmark
- Builder: Odense Steel Shipyard, Odense
- Yard number: 109
- Launched: 18 December 1948
- Completed: July 1949
- Identification: Radio call sign: OUOAR; IMO number: 5262407
- Fate: Acquired by Mermaid Marine Co, 1968
- Name: Valentine
- Operator: Mermaid Marine Co
- Port of registry: (Liberia) Monrovia
- Acquired: 1968
- Fate: Acquired by Liberty SS Co Ltd, 1974
- Name: North Sea
- Operator: Liberty SS Co Ltd
- Port of registry: (Somalia) Mogadishu
- Acquired: 1974
- Fate: Acquired by Man Ming Maritime Ltd, 1975
- Name: Man Ming
- Operator: Man Ming Maritime Ltd
- Port of registry: Panama City
- Acquired: 1975
- Fate: Broken up in Kaohsiung, Taiwan by Gi Yuen Steel Enterprise Co Ltd, 1979

General characteristics
- Type: Cargo ship
- Tonnage: 9,950 DWT; 6,591 GRT; 3,788 NRT
- Length: 453.2 ft (138.1 m)
- Beam: 62.1 ft (18.9 m)
- Depth: 28.4 ft (8.7 m)

MS Olga Mærsk was a cargo ship belonging to the fleet of Danish shipping company A.P. Møller Mærsk. It was launched on 18 December 1948 and completed in July 1949.

In the following year, it was handed over to Mærsk and was part of its fleet until 1968. It was then acquired by Mermaid Maritime and renamed Valentine. She was subsequently acquired first by Liberty SS Co Ltd as North Sea in 1974 and finally as Man Mang for Man Ming Maritime Ltd in 1975. She was broken up in Kaohsiung, Taiwan in 1979.
