= MV Liberty Star =

NASA ship

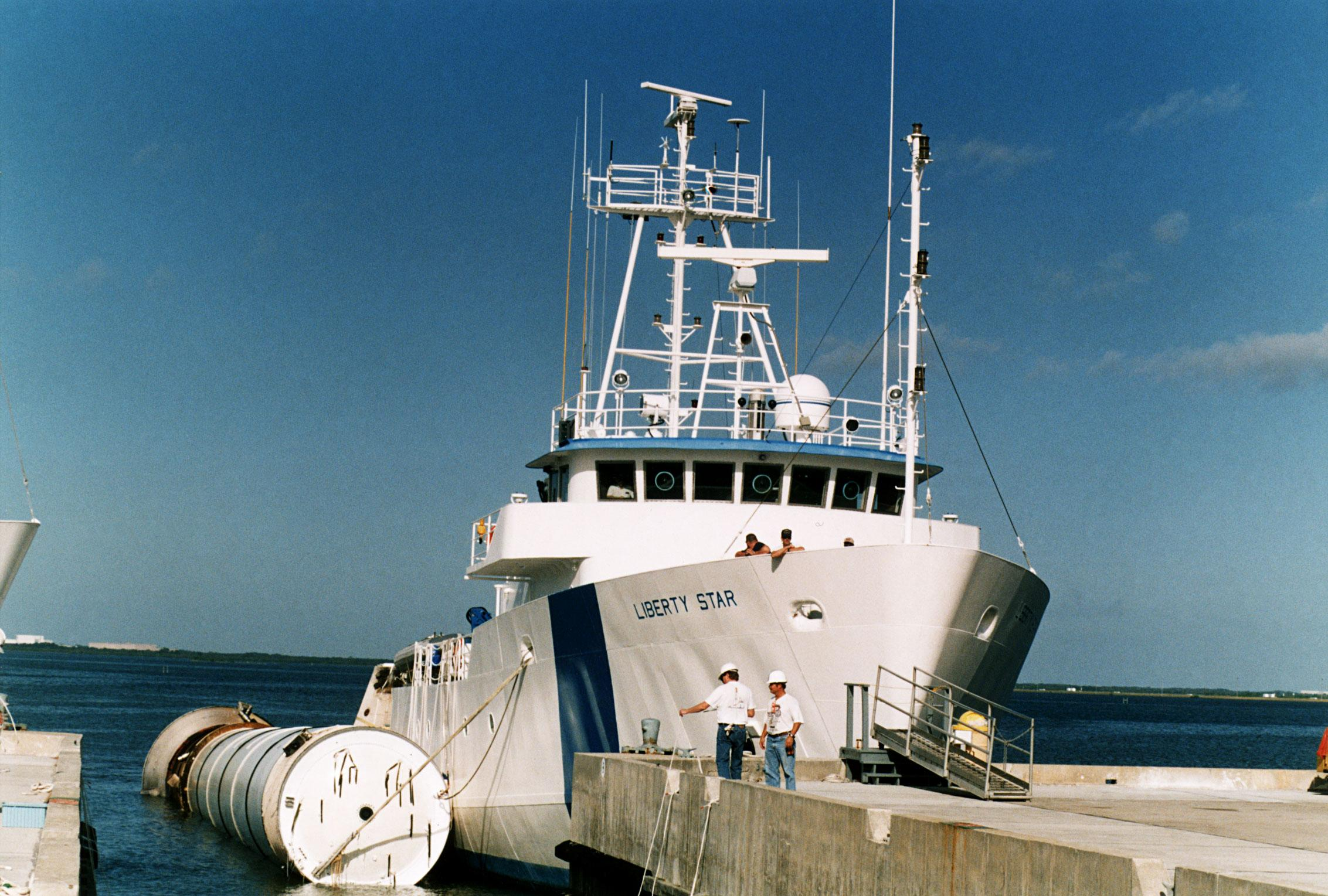

History

United States
- Name: MV Liberty Star; T/V Kings Pointer V
- Owner: NASA; United States Merchant Marine Academy
- Operator: United Space Alliance; United States Merchant Marine Academy
- Builder: Atlantic Marine Shipyard, Fort George Island, Florida, U.S.
- Christened: September 27, 1980
- Acquired: October 1980
- In service: January 1981
- Out of service: September 14, 2012
- Home port: Port Canaveral, Florida, U.S.
- Identification: Call sign: WRPH; IMO number: 7925302; MMSI number: 338990000
- Status: Transferred to Maritime Administration

History

United States
- Name: TV Kings Pointer
- Owner: U.S. Dept of Transportation
- Operator: U.S. Maritime Administration
- Acquired: September 14, 2012
- Home port: Kings Point, New York, U.S.
- Status: In service

General characteristics
- Tonnage: 484 GT, 743 GRT; 239 NT, 222 NRT
- Displacement: 1,052 short tons (954 t)
- Length: 176 ft (53.6 m)
- Beam: 37 ft (11.3 m)
- Height: 72 ft (21.9 m)
- Draft: 12 ft (3.7 m)
- Depth: 15 ft (4.6 m)
- Installed power: 2 × 223 hp (166 kW) Kato generators
- Propulsion: 2 × 1,450 hp (1,080 kW) GM EMD 12-645E6A diesel engines, driving 2 propellers; 2 × 450 hp (340 kW) Detroit Diesel 8V71 engines, driving bow and stern thrusters
- Speed: 15 kn (28 km/h; 17 mph)
- Range: 6,900 mi (11,100 km)
- Endurance: 30 days
- Capacity: 24 maximum
- Complement: 10 × crew; 9 × retrieval specialists; 1 × retrieval supervisor
- Notes: Towing capacity: 60,000 lb (27,200 kg)

MV Liberty Star is a formerly NASA-owned and United Space Alliance-operated vessel which primarily served as an SRB recovery ship following the launch of Space Shuttle missions. It also performed tugboat duties and acted as a research platform. In 2012, it was transferred to the U.S. Department of Transportation for use as a training vessel at the United States Merchant Marine Academy as the T/V Kings Pointer. Her sister ship is the MV Freedom Star.

== History ==
The recovery ships were built at Atlantic Marine Shipyard on Fort George Island, Florida, and delivered in January 1981 to their original owner, United Technologies Corporation. As well as recovering the Space Shuttle, SRB's Liberty Star has since 1998 been used to tow the Space Shuttle external fuel tanks from their assembly plant at Michoud Assembly Facility near New Orleans, Louisiana, to the Vehicle Assembly Building at the Kennedy Space Center in Florida. She served a similar role in recovering the first test flight of the Ares I and was anticipated to continue recovering boosters for the Constellation program before it was canceled in 2010.

The Liberty Star underwent special strengthening enhancements to withstand the greater burden of towing the external fuel tanks. The stern was strengthened at critical points, new bulwark fairings were added, and an H-bitt was installed through which cabling is threaded to keep it centered during towing operations. Also installed was a hydraulic towing winch, referred to as a double-drum waterfall winch, holding 2,000 feet (610 m) or more of wire rope on each drum. One drum supports booster retrievals while the other is devoted to external tank towing.

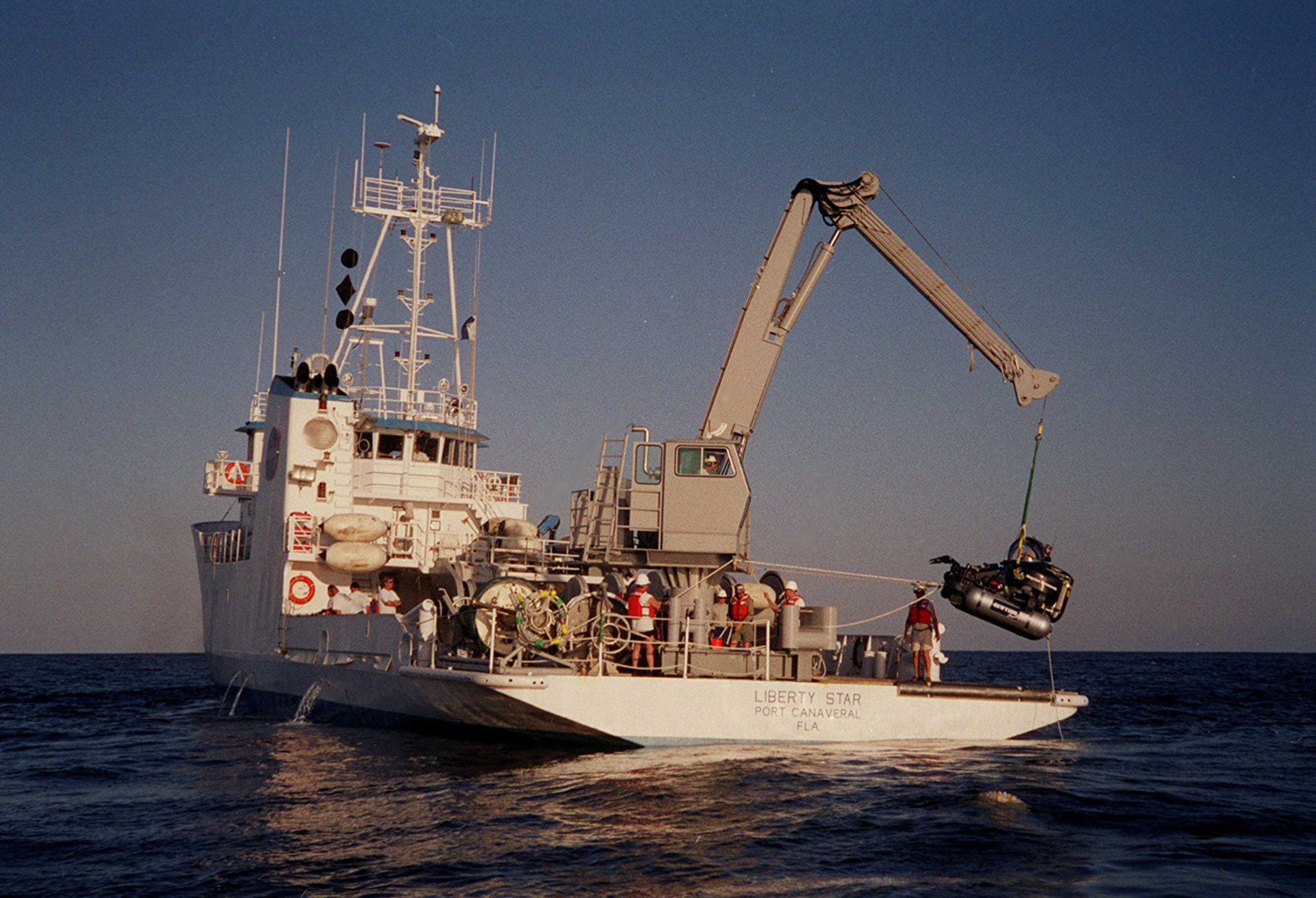
Liberty Star carrying the DeepWorker 2000 submersible

Liberty Star has also occasionally been used to support scientific research operations including research for the National Oceanic and Atmospheric Administration and several universities. She is usually docked alongside her sister at the Solid Rocket Booster processing facility at the Cape Canaveral Space Force Station in Florida.

Each ship is propelled by two main engines providing a total of 2,900 horsepower. The main engines turn two seven-foot (2.1-meter) propellers with controllable pitch, which provides greater response time and maneuverability. The ships also are equipped with two thrusters. The stern thruster is a water jet system that allows the ship to move in any direction without the use of propellers. This system was installed to protect the endangered manatee population that inhabits regions of the Banana River where the ships are based. The system also allows divers to work near the ship during operations at a greatly reduced risk.

=== Transfer ===
On August 21, 2012, NASA agreed to transfer the Liberty Star to the U.S. Department of Transportation for use as a training vessel at the United States Merchant Marine Academy. The ship arrived at Kings Point, New York, on September 13, 2012, with formal turnover occurring on September 14. After being refit for training duty, which included additional berthing, she was renamed TV Kings Pointer, the fifth vessel of the Academy to carry that name. The transfer agreement stipulated that NASA could again use the vessel on future missions if she was available.
