= MV Brandanger (1948) =

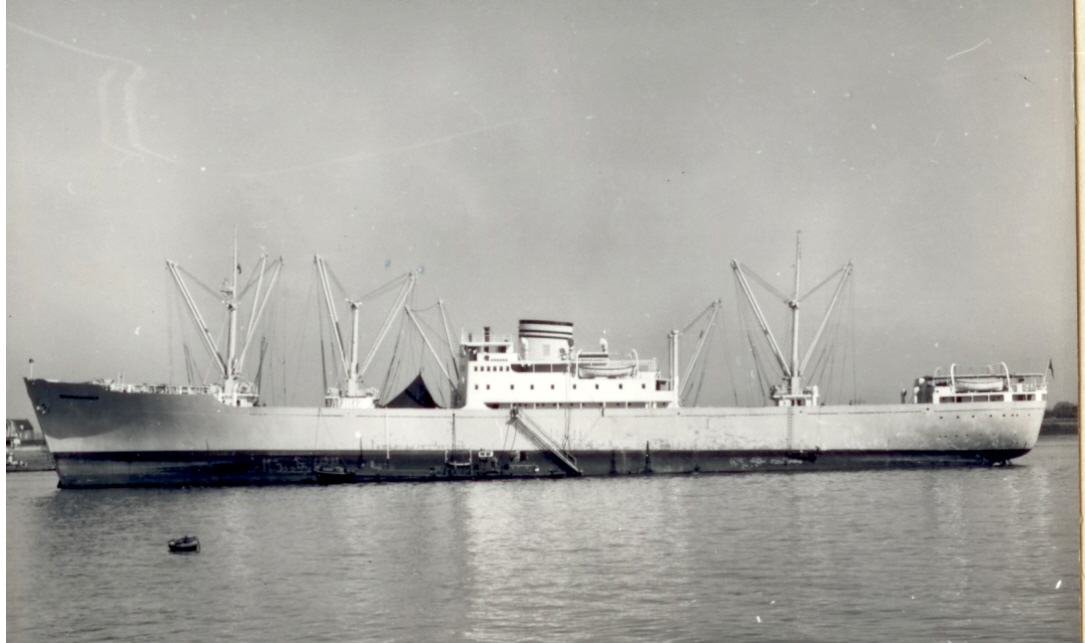
- MV Brandanger in 1949

History

Norway
- Name: Brandanger
- Port of registry: Det Norske Veritas
- Builder: Joseph L. Thompson & Co, Sunderland
- Yard number: 657
- Launched: 4 September 1948
- Completed: 7 March 1949
- Out of service: 1965
- Fate: Sold

Bulgaria
- Name: Alkaid
- Owner: Navigation Maritime Bulgare
- Port of registry: Bourgas
- Acquired: 1965
- Out of service: 1971
- Identification: IMO number: 5050309; MMSI number: 207261209; Callsign: LZFY
- Fate: Converted training ship

Bulgaria
- Name: Petar Beron
- Owner: Navigation Maritime Bulgare
- Port of registry: Varna
- Acquired: 1971
- Out of service: 2015
- Identification: IMO number: 5050309; MMSI number: 207261209; Callsign: LZFY
- Fate: Scrapped 16 January 2015

General characteristics
- Class & type: Single screw
- Tonnage: 7,392 GRT
- Length: 139.17 m (456 ft)
- Beam: 18.01 m (59 ft)
- Draught: 8.41 m (27 ft)
- Depth: 11.84 m (38 ft)
- Installed power: 4100 kW
- Propulsion: Doxford diesel engine
- Speed: 15 kn

MV Brandanger delivered in 1949 was a general purpose cargo ship, previously owned by the Norwegian shipping company Westfal-Larsen. The vessel was sold to Bulgaria in 1965, renamed Alkaid. In 1971 she became Petar Beron, being converted into a school ship. As from 1980 she was laid up in Varna, Bulgaria as a stationary training ship . On 16 January 2015 she arrived at Aliağa for scrapping.
