= BAE Systems Southeast Shipyards =

- Company type: Division
- Predecessor: Atlantic Marine
- Founded: 2010
- Headquarters: Jacksonville, Florida, United States
- Number of locations: 3
- Area served: Mid-Atlantic U.S. Southeastern U.S. U.S. Gulf Coast
- Services: Ship building, conversion, repairs, and maintenance
- Number of employees: 1700
- Website: BAE Systems Ship Repair

BAE Systems Southeast Shipyards is a division of BAE Systems Ship Repair, which itself is a subsidiary of BAE Systems Inc., the North American arm of British defense conglomerate BAE Systems. It was formed through the acquisition of Atlantic Marine from the J.F. Lehman and Company private equity firm in May 2010 for $352 million.

BAE Systems Southeast Shipyards is headquartered in Jacksonville, Florida, with shipyards at Jacksonville, Mayport, Florida and formerly in Mobile, Alabama. The Florida facilities employ an approximate combined total of 900 people and the Mobile facility had employed approximately 800. The Florida yards are considered to be the Southeast Coast facilities. The Jacksonville shipyard performs luxury yacht refits and repairs, commercial and naval ship repairs and conversions, industrial and marine fabrication, and assembly. The Mayport facility, located on leased property at Naval Station Mayport, performs maintenance and repair on United States Navy ships. The Gulf Coast facility at Mobile had provided dry docking and heavy-lift capacity for the largest ships, pier space, industrial and marine fabrication, equipment and system installation until its closure in 2018.
