= Pyrotechnic fastener =

Type of quick release fastener

A pyrotechnic fastener (also called an explosive bolt, or pyro, within context) is a fastener, usually a nut or bolt, that incorporates a pyrotechnic charge that can be initiated remotely. One or more explosive charges embedded within the bolt are typically activated by an electric current, and the charge breaks the bolt into two or more pieces. The bolt is typically scored around its circumference at the point(s) where the severance should occur. Such bolts are often used in space applications to ensure separation between rocket stages, because they are lighter and much more reliable than mechanical latches.

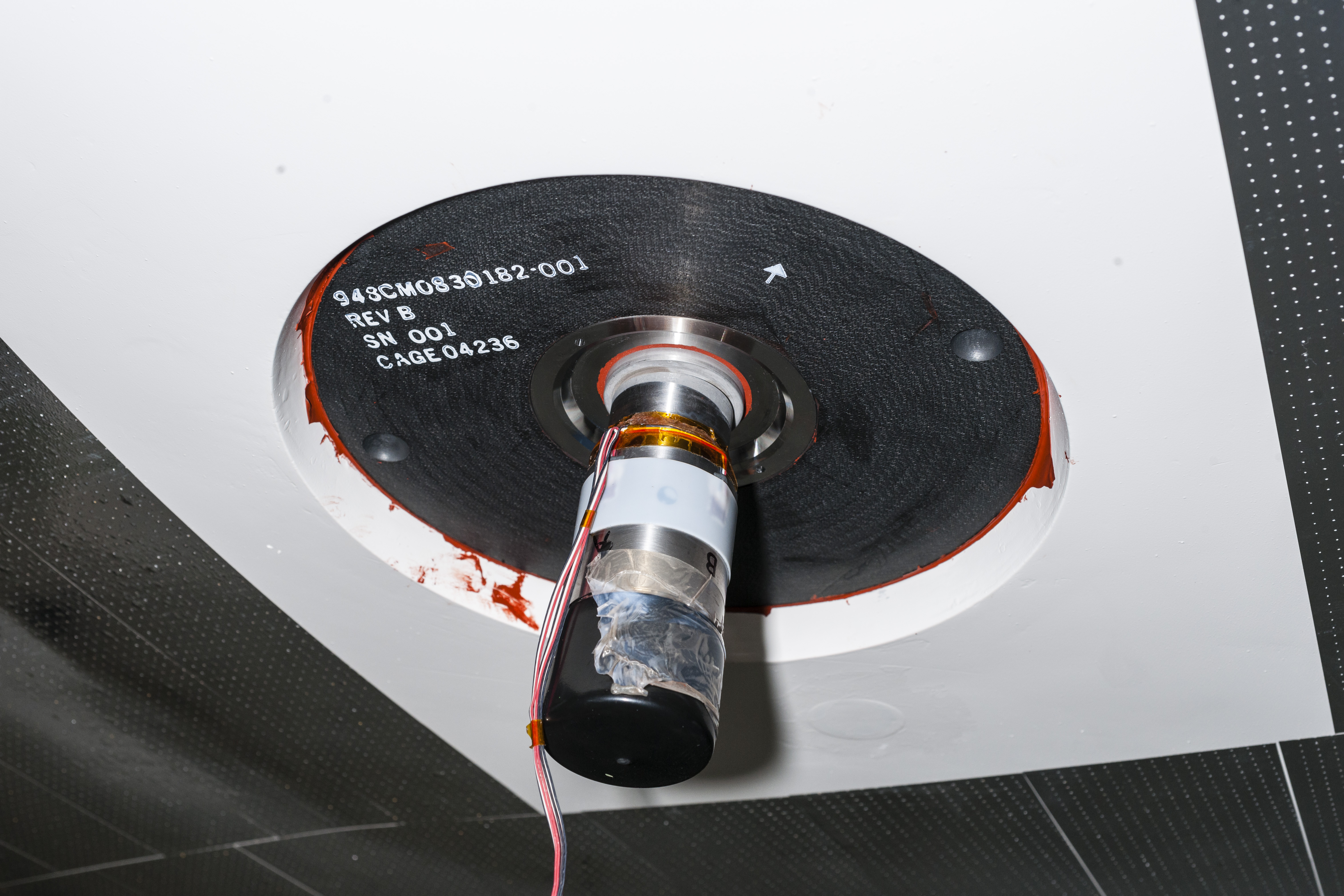
Explosive bolt in an Orion module

In applications that require safety, precision and reliability, such as the aerospace industry, pyrotechnic fasteners are triggered using exploding bridgewire detonators, which were themselves later succeeded by slapper detonators. Classical blasting caps are generally avoided for such usage.

More recent developments have used pulsed laser diodes to detonate initiators through fiber-optic cables, which subsequently fire the main charge.

Gas generators are similar to pyrotechnic fasteners. They are used to generate large amounts of gas, as for turbopumps, to inflate balloons, especially airbags, to eject parachutes and similar applications.

== Compositions used ==
Various pyrotechnic compositions can be used, depending on the desired burn rate and required amount of energy and volume of gas produced. Some materials, such as RDX, sublime in vacuum, which limits their usefulness in aerospace applications. Composition with the character of bipropellants and flash powders are often used.

=== Standard pyrotechnic mixtures used by NASA ===
- Manganese / barium chromate / lead chromate: Time-delay mix, used for sequencing. Gasless burning.
- RDX / nitrocellulose: Gas generator, unsuitable for deep space missions, burn rate dependent on pressure.
- Boron / potassium nitrate: Gas generator and rocket-motor igniter, thermally stable, stable in vacuum, burn rate independent of pressure.
- Zirconium / potassium perchlorate: Used in the NASA Standard Initiator (NSI). Rapid pressure rise, little gas but emits hot particles, thermally stable, vacuum stable, long shelf life. Sensitive to static electricity. Known to cause circuit damage during ground testing.
- Lead azide: Used as a primary explosive. Sensitive to impact, friction, and static electricity. Thermally and vacuum stable, if dextrin is not used for desensitizing. Long shelf life.
- Hexanitrostilbene: Used in detonators, linear shaped charges, and bulk explosives. Insensitive to stimuli other than explosion. Thermally stable. Vacuum stable. Used in deep space applications where RDX can not be utilized, such as aboard the Apollo Lunar Module Detonates at 22,000 feet per second (6,700 m/s).

== See also ==
- Frangible nut, the counterpart of the explosive bolt
