= NSI =

NSI or nsi may refer to:

== Organizations ==
=== Government and politics ===
- National Savings and Investments, United Kingdom
- National Security Intelligence, Bangladesh
- National Statistical Institute (Bulgaria)
- Nationwide Suspicious Activity Reporting Initiative, an American law enforcement program
- New Slovenia, a Slovenian political party
- North-South Institute, a Canadian think tank

=== Scientific bodies ===
- The National Science Institute, an American educational organization
- National Space Institute, an American advocacy group
- Neurological Society of India, an Indian body for neuroscientists
- The Neurosciences Institute, United States

=== Other businesses and organizations ===
- National Screen Institute, a non-profit organization in Canada
- National Security Inspectorate, home security trade organisation in the UK
- Network Solutions, LLC., formerly Network Solutions Inc., a technology company founded in 1979
- Northern Sydney Institute of TAFE, an Australian vocational training provider
- NSÍ Runavík, a Faroe Islands football team

== Places ==
- North Sentinel Island, Andaman Islands, India
- Naval Outlying Landing Field San Nicolas Island, a military airfield in California, US (FAA LID:NSI)
- Yaoundé Nsimalen International Airport (IATA:NSI)

== Science and technology ==
- NASA Standard Initiator, an electrochemical device which plays a critical role in initiating various pyrotechnic events in the National Space Transportation System
- Nitrogen solubility index, a measure of the solubility of a protein
- Norwegian Scientific Index, a bibliographic database aimed at covering and rating all serious academic publication channels worldwide
- .nsi, a text file extension used by Nullsoft Scriptable Install System

== Other uses ==
- National Student Index, a system to identify New Zealand students
- National systems of innovation

== See also ==
- NS1 (disambiguation)
- NSL (disambiguation)
