= PDI =

PDI may refer to:

== Organizations ==
- Investigations Police of Chile (Spanish: Policia de Investigaciones de Chile)
- Party for Justice and Integration (Albanian: Partia për Drejtësi dhe Integrim), an Albanian political party
- Pacific Data Images (1980-2015), an American computer animation company
- Paul Drude Institute for solid state electronics, German research institute
- Philippine Daily Inquirer, a newspaper
- Plumbing & Drainage Institute, US
- Ideal Democratic Party, political party in Rwanda
- Partai Demokrasi Indonesia (Indonesian Democratic Party) (1973–2004), a defunct political party
- Polo Democrático Independiente (Independent Democratic Pole), a Colombian democratic political party

== Chemistry and biochemistry ==
- Pyridinediimine, organic compounds used as ligands
- Perylenediimide, a rylene dye
- Photodynamic inactivation, or antimicrobial photodynamic therapy
- Protein dispersibility index, in water
- Protein disulfide isomerase, an enzyme
- Polydispersity index, molecular weight distribution of polymers
- Pentamethylene diisocyanate, a bio-based diisocyanate prepared from pentamethylene diamine

== Computing ==
- Pentaho Data Integration, design data flow software
- Versit Consortium's Personal Data Interchange
- Pop Directional Isolate, Unicode bidirectional text character
- Portable Database Image format (.pdi)
- Atmel Program and Debug Interface

== Other ==
- Pacific Deterrence Initiative, a deterrence framework by the United States Department of Defense
- Postal Development Indicator, a UPU ranking
- Peripheral drift illusion, a motion illusion
- Pilot direction indicator, for aircraft bombing
- Power Distance Index, a measure of social power acceptance
- Powered Descent Initiation, of Apollo moon landing
