= Nitrogen solubility index =

The nitrogen solubility index (NSI) is a measure of the solubility of the protein in a substance. It is typically used as a quick measure of the functionality of a protein, for example to predict the ability of the protein to stabilise foams, emulsions or gels. To determine the NSI, the sample is dried, dispersed in a 0.1 M salt solution, centrifuged and filtered. The NSI is the amount of Nitrogen in this filtered solution divided by the nitrogen in the initial sample, as measured by the Kjeldahl method.

The relevance of the NSI is based on the fact that proteins are the major biological source of Nitrogen: for various types of protein, there are empirical formulas which correlate the nitrogen content to the protein content. Other related measures of protein solubility are the Protein Solubility Index (PSI), the Protein Dispersibility index (PDI). These are based on a specific protein assay, rather than a nitrogen assay, and the dispersibility index differs from the solubility index, in that the sample is dispersed with a high-shear mixer and then strained through a screen instead of being centrifuged and filtered.
