= NS1 =

NS1 or variants may refer to:

== Rail stations ==
- Jurong East MRT station, Singapore, station code NS1
- Kawanishi-Noseguchi Station, Kawanishi, Japan, station code NS01
- Ōmiya Station (Saitama), Japan, station code NS01

== Aerospace ==
- NS1, a British NS class airship
- Spartan NS-1, US military trainer biplane
- Stearman NS-1, US military trainer biplane
- New Shepard 1, a reusable sub-orbital launch vehicle

== Other uses ==
- NS1 influenza protein
- NS1 antigen test, for dengue
- Novelty seeking level 1, exploratory excitability
- ns (simulator) version ns-1, computer network simulation software

== See also ==
- NSI (disambiguation)
- NSL (disambiguation)
- NS (disambiguation)
- 1 (disambiguation)
