= NSL =

NSL may refer to:

== Government and politics ==
=== United States ===
- National Security League, a military preparedness non-profit, 1914–1942
- National security letter, an administrative subpoena (used since 1978)
- National Socialist League (United States), a gay neo-Nazi party, 1974–1980s
- National Socialist Legion, a neo-Nazi group, formed 2018

=== Elsewhere ===
- National Socialist League (United Kingdom), a British Nazi group, 1937–1939
- National Security Act (South Korea), 1948
- Hong Kong national security law, 2020

== Sports ==
- National Soccer League (disambiguation)
- National Softball League, a British co-ed slow-pitch softball league
- Nebraska State League, an American basketball league
- Netball Superleague, a British netball league
- Northern Super League, a Canadian women's soccer league
- Nottinghamshire Senior League, an English association football league

== Transportation ==
- NSL Buses, London, England
- National speed limit, on roads
- North–South Line (Singapore) of the Singapore Mass Rapid Transit system

== Languages ==
- Nepali Sign Language
- Norwegian Sign Language
- Nicaraguan Sign Language

== Other uses ==
- NSL (company), a British outsourcing firm, formed 2007
- Nanosphere lithography, etching on nanometre-sized balls
- Nintendo Switch Lite, a 2019 video game console
- Nuziveedu Seeds Limited, an Indian agricultural business, formed 1973

== See also ==
- National Security Law (disambiguation)
- Negro Southern League (disambiguation)
- NSEL (disambiguation)
- NSI (disambiguation)
- NS1 (disambiguation)
