= Negro Southern League =

Negro Southern League may refer to either or both of two Negro baseball leagues in the US in the first half of the twentieth century:

- Negro Southern League (1920–1936)
- Negro Southern League (1945–1951)

== See also ==
- NSL (disambiguation)
