= Mobile launcher platform =

Structure used to support large rockets

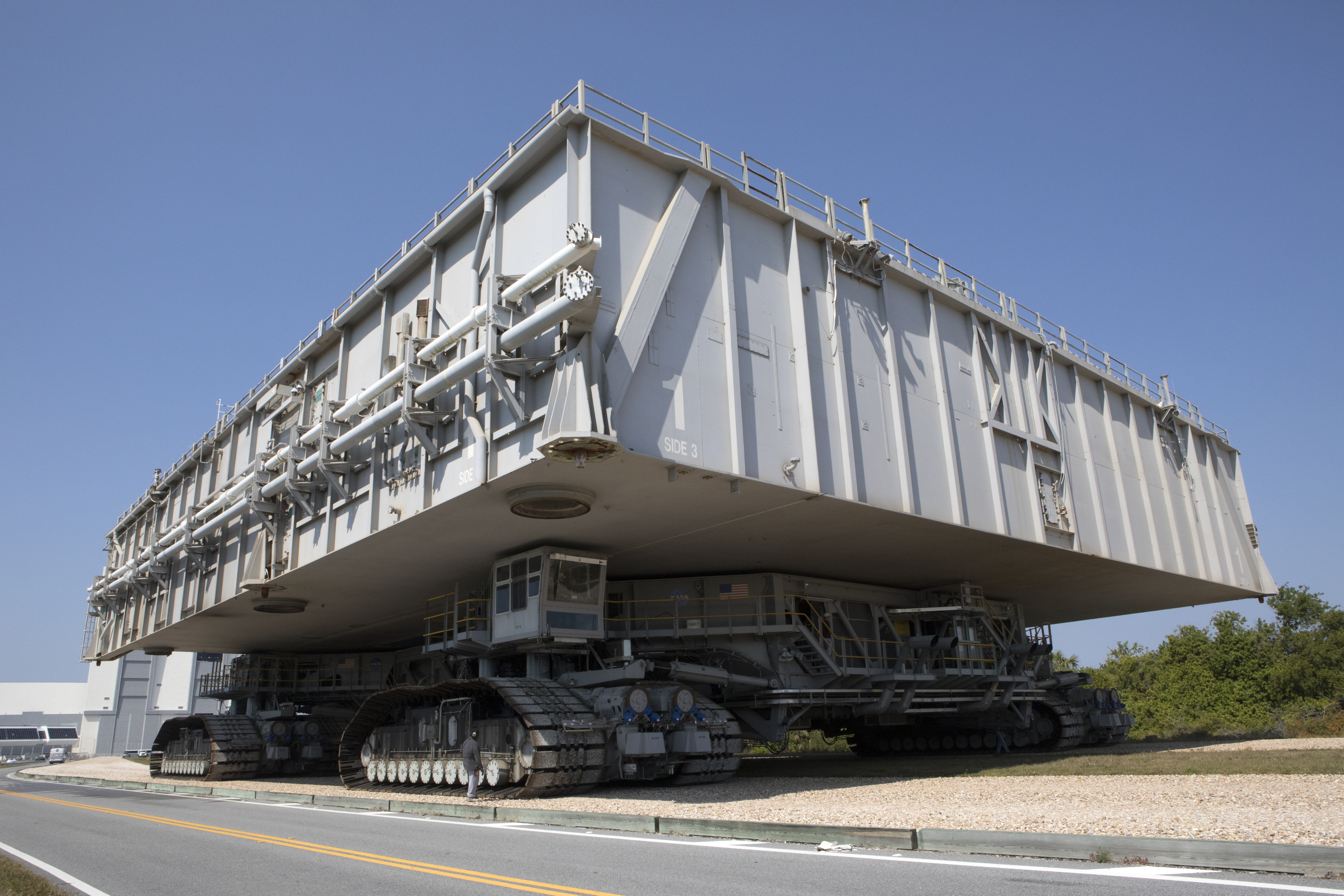
The Shuttle-era Mobile Launcher Platform-1 on top of a crawler-transporter

A mobile launcher platform (MLP) is a structure used to support a large multistage space vehicle. The vehicle is assembled vertically in an integration facility, such as the Vehicle Assembly Building, and then transported to a launch pad by a vehicle, like the crawler-transporter. At the pad, the platform serves as the structural and service interface for launch operations.

The use of a mobile launcher platform is associated with the Integrate-Transfer-Launch (ITL) approach, in which launch vehicles are assembled and transported to the pad vertically, and launched from the same structure. The concept was first implemented in the 1960s for the United States Air Force's Titan III rocket, and was later adopted by NASA for the Saturn V, Space Shuttle, and Space Launch System. Similar systems have also been used by other launch providers, including United Launch Alliance (ULA)'s Atlas V and Vulcan Centaur, the Indian Space Research Organisation (ISRO), and the Japan Aerospace Exploration Agency (JAXA).

Alternative launch integration methods include the use of a transporter erector, in which a vehicle is assembled and transported horizontally before being raised to a vertical position at the launch pad. This approach is used by most Russian launch vehicles, including Soyuz, as well as by SpaceX for the Falcon 9 family and previously by ULA for the Delta IV family. Another method is vertical assembly directly on the launch pad, which has been used for some smaller launch vehicles, the Saturn I family, the SpaceX Starship, and was proposed for Space Shuttle launches from the West Coast.

== Kennedy Space Center ==
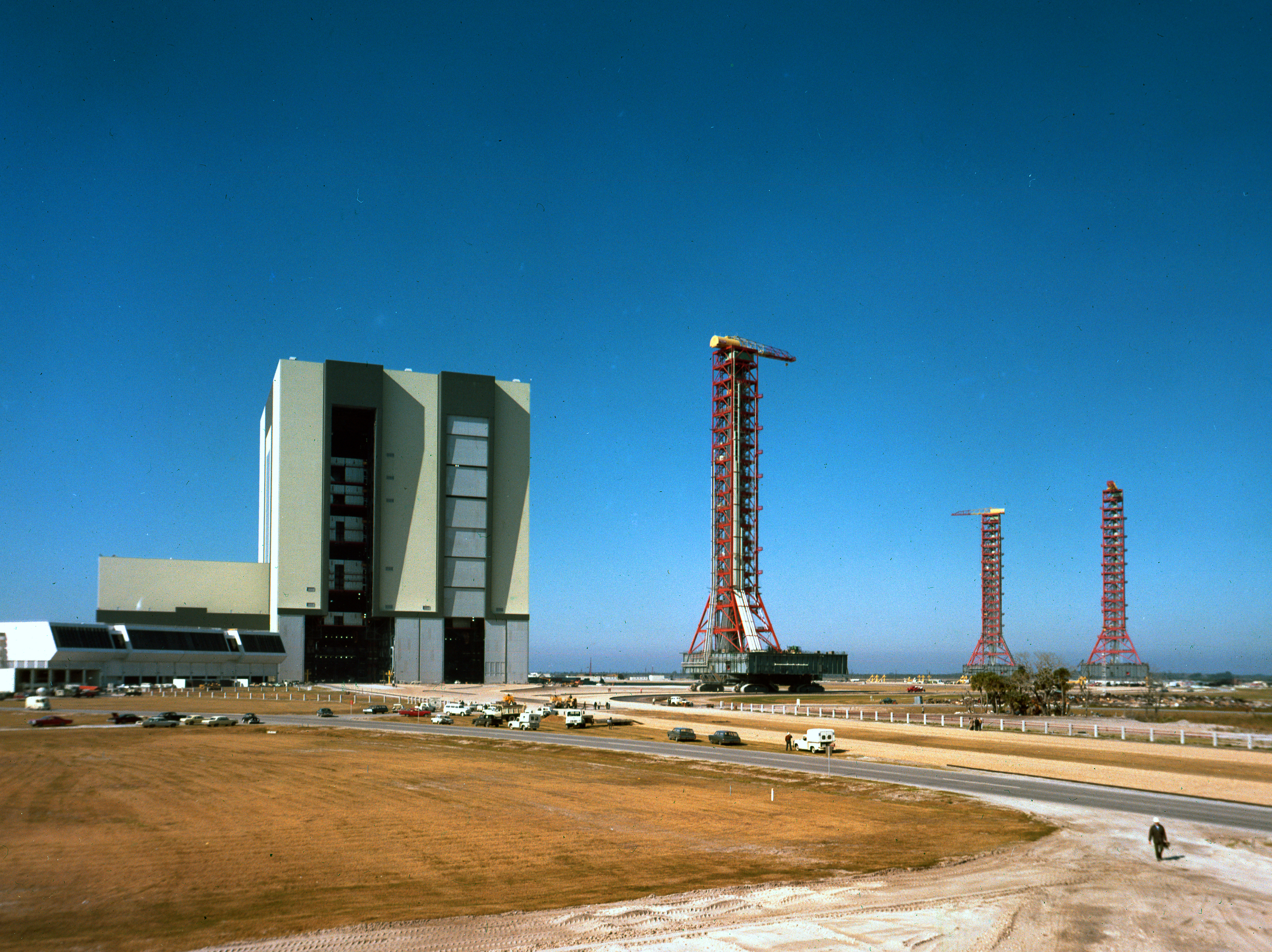
The three Mobile Launchers used for Saturn V

From 1967 to 2011, three platforms were used at Launch Complex 39 to support NASA's launch vehicles at the Kennedy Space Center. Formerly called Mobile Launchers (ML), the mobile launcher platforms were constructed for transporting and launching the Saturn V rocket for the Apollo program lunar landing missions of the 1960s and 1970s. Each ML originally had a single exhaust vent for the Saturn V's engines. The Mobile Launchers also featured a 380-foot-tall (120 m) Launch Umbilical Tower (LUT) with nine swing arms that permitted servicing of the vehicle on the launch pad, and swung away from it at launch.

The Mobile Launchers were built by Ingalls Iron Works. The swing arms were constructed by Hayes International.

After the Apollo program, the bases of the Mobile Launchers were modified for the Space Shuttle. The Launch Umbilical Towers from ML-2 and ML-3 were removed. Portions of these tower structures were erected at the two launch pads, 39A and 39B. These permanent structures were known as the Fixed Service Structures (FSS). The LUT from ML-1 was taken apart and stored in the Kennedy Space Center's industrial area. Efforts to preserve the LUT in the 1990s failed due to a lack of funding, and it was scrapped.

In addition to removal of the umbilical towers, each Shuttle-era MLP was extensively reconfigured with the addition of two Tail Service Masts (TSM), one on either side of the main engine exhaust vent. These 9.4 m (31 ft) masts contained the feed lines through which liquid hydrogen (LH_{2}) and liquid oxygen (LOX) were loaded into the Space Shuttle external tank, as well as electrical hookups and flares that were used to burn off any ambient hydrogen vapors at the launch site immediately prior to Main Engine start.

The main engines vented their exhaust through the original opening used for the Saturn rocket exhaust. Two additional exhaust ports were added to vent exhaust from the Space Shuttle Solid Rocket Boosters (SRBs) that flanked the external fuel tank.

The Space Shuttle assembly was held to the MLP at eight holddown points using large studs, four on the aft skirt of each Solid Rocket Booster. Immediately before SRB ignition, frangible nuts attached to the top of these studs were detonated, releasing the Shuttle assembly from the platform.

Each MLP weighed 8.23 million pounds (3,730 tonnes) unloaded and roughly 11 million pounds (5,000 tonnes) with an unfueled Shuttle aboard, measured 160 by 135 feet (49 by 41 m), and was 25 feet (7.6 m) high. They were carried by one of two crawler-transporters (CT), which measure 131 by 114 feet (40 by 35 m), and 20 feet (6.1 m) high. Each crawler weighs about 6 million pounds (2,700 tonnes) unloaded, has a maximum speed of about 1 mile per hour (1.6 km/h) loaded, and has a leveling system designed to keep the launch vehicle vertical while negotiating the 5 percent grade (slope) leading to the top of the launch pad. Two 2,750 horsepower (2.05 MW) Diesel engines drive generators which in turn provide power to the electric traction engines.

The MLPs were designed as part of NASA's strategy for vertical assembly and transport of space vehicles. Vertical assembly allows the preparation of the spacecraft in a ready-for-launch position, and avoids the additional step of lifting or craning a horizontally-assembled vehicle onto the launchpad (as the engineers of the Soviet space program chose to do), while also occupying the launch pad for shorter amounts of time and allowing for more expansive integration facilities.

=== Mobile Launcher Platform-1 ===
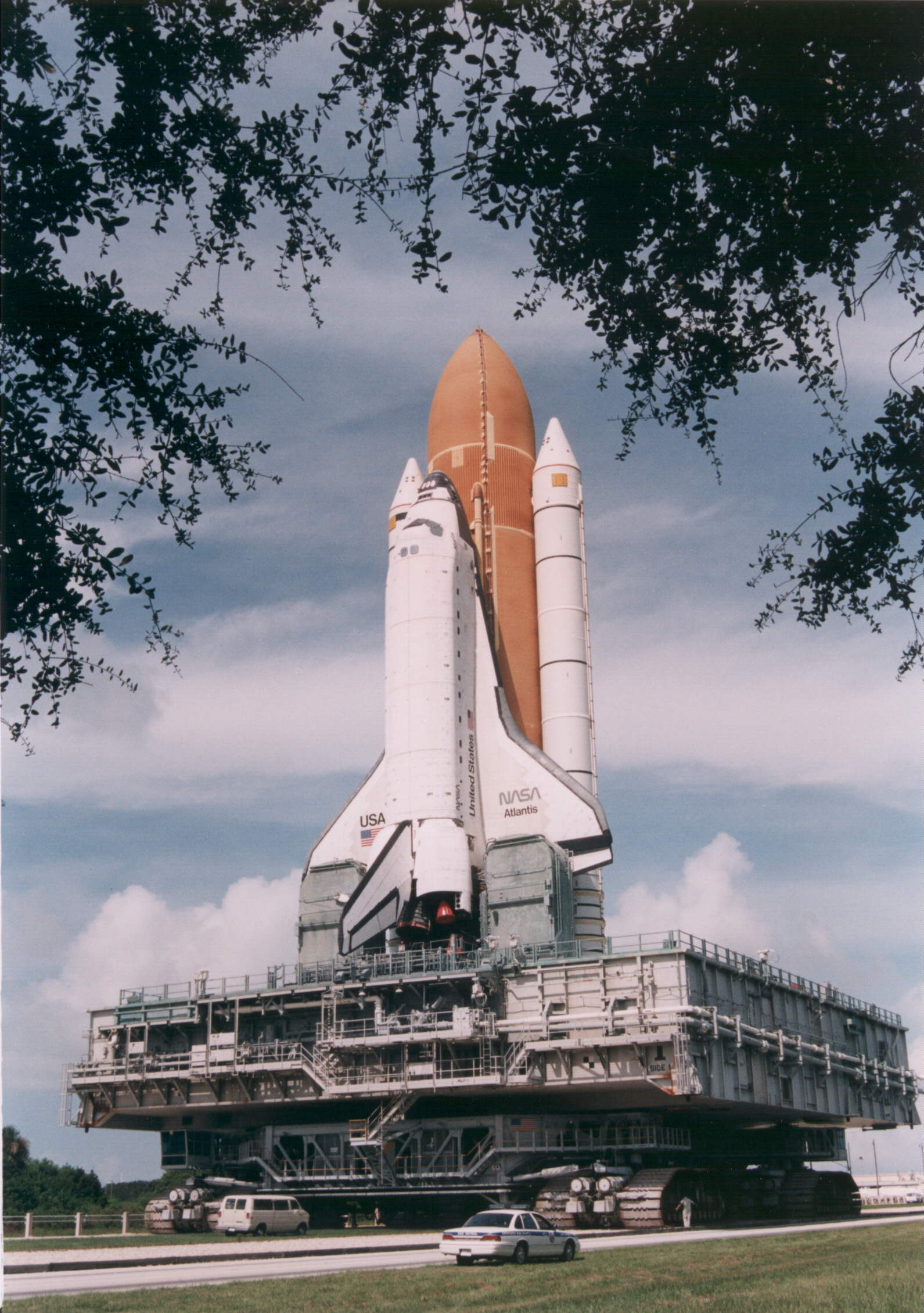
Space Shuttle Atlantis is carried atop MLP-1 in the lead-up to STS-79

Construction of the Mobile Launcher Platform-1 (MLP-1) (formerly called the Mobile Launcher-3 or ML-3) began in 1964 and was completed with the installation of the Launch Umbilical Tower hammerhead crane on March 1, 1965. The swing arms were added at a later date.

The ML-3 was used for five crewed Apollo launches; Apollo 10, Apollo 13, Apollo 15, Apollo 16 and Apollo 17.

Following the launch of Apollo 17, the ML-3 was the first of the Mobile Launchers to be converted for use by the Space Shuttle. The Launch Umbilical Tower was dismantled and later partially reassembled on LC-39A as that pad's Fixed Service Structure (FSS) and the base of the launch platform was modified to accommodate the locations of engines on the Shuttle. The platform was redesignated MLP-1.

In total, the MLP-1 was used for 52 Shuttle launches between 1981 and 2009. It was used for the first Space Shuttle launch, STS-1, in April 1981. Following the launch of STS-119 in March 2009, it was transferred to the Constellation program. The platform was used only for the Ares I-X and the MLP-1 suffered substantial damage. The canceled Ares I-Y would have used the same MLP. However, the Constellation program was canceled and the MLP was left unused.

Following the final Space Shuttle launch, STS-135, usable parts from the MLP-1 were removed and stored in the Vehicle Assembly Building, with no plans to use the MLP again.

In 2021, NASA began rolling out Mobile Launch Platform-1 on Crawler transporter-2 with a concrete ballast on the top to condition the crawlerway to handle the combined weight of the Space Launch System and Orion spacecraft in the future. NASA stated that re-conditioning of the crawlerway will be required periodically in the future, and MLP-1 will be retained for that purpose. MLP-1 will be stored in High Bay 1 of the Vehicle Assembly Building when not in use for crawlerway maintenance.

=== Mobile Launcher Platform-2 ===
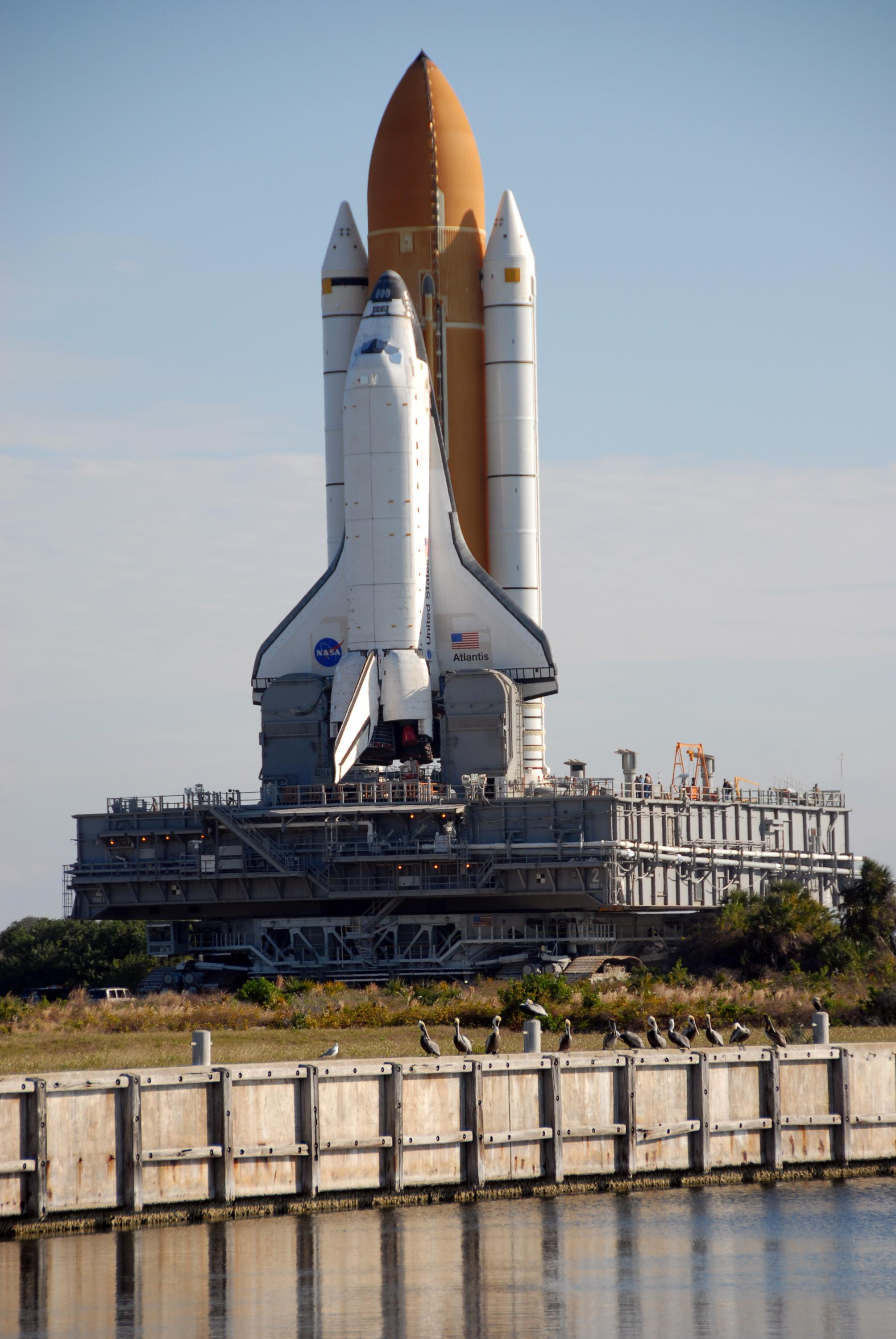
Space Shuttle Atlantis is carried atop MLP-2 in the lead-up to STS-117

Mobile Launcher Platform-2 (MLP-2) (formerly called the Mobile Launcher-2 or ML-2) was used for the uncrewed Apollo 6 mission, followed by three crewed Apollo launches; Apollo 9, Apollo 12 and Apollo 14. It was subsequently used for the launch of Skylab on a Saturn V in 1973.

Following the launch of Skylab, ML-2 was the second of the Mobile Launchers to be converted for use by the Space Shuttle. The Launch Umbilical Tower was dismantled and partially reassembled to become the LC-39B Fixed Service Structure (FSS), and the base of the launch platform was modified to accommodate the locations of engines on the Shuttle. The platform was redesignated MLP-2.

In total, MLP-2 was used for 44 Shuttle launches, starting in 1983. All of the orbiters except Columbia made their maiden flights from MLP-2. It was also the launch site for the ill-fated STS-51L mission, when Space Shuttle Challenger disintegrated shortly after launch, killing all seven crew members.

Following the Space Shuttle retirement, NASA kept the MLP-2 for liquid-propellant rockets, but in January 2021, NASA announced that due to lack of storage space, the massive structure would be demolished.

=== Mobile Launcher Platform-3 ===
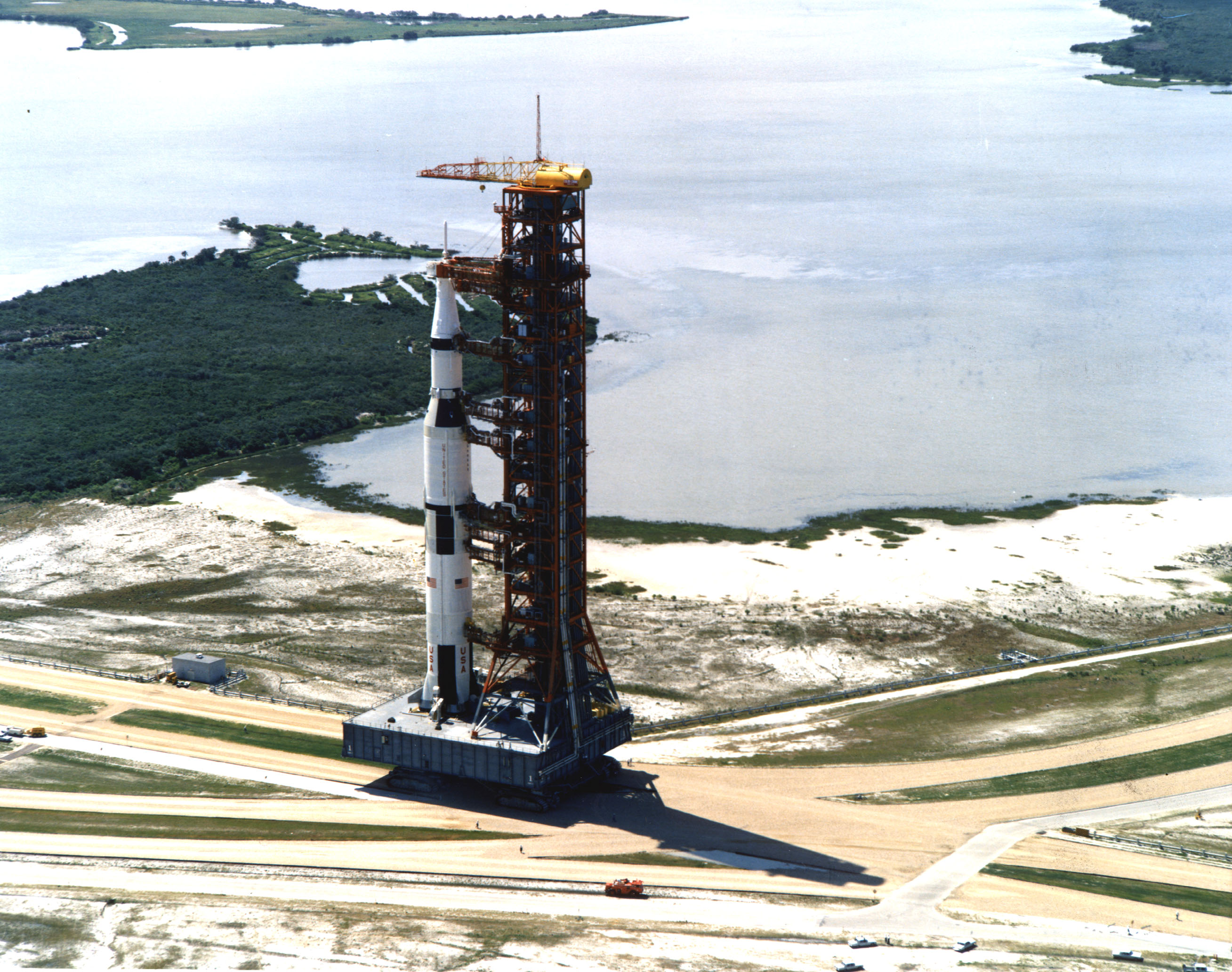
A Saturn V is carried atop the ML-1 in the lead-up to Apollo 11

The first launch from the Mobile Launcher Platform-3 (MLP-3) (formerly called the Mobile Launcher-1 or ML-1) was the maiden flight of the Saturn V, and the first launch from LC-39, Apollo 4. Following this, it was used for two crewed Apollo launches: Apollo 8 and Apollo 11. After NASA decided to move Saturn IB launches from Launch Complex 34 to Launch Complex-39B, the ML-1 was modified by the addition of a structure known as the Milkstool, which allowed the Saturn IB to use the same Launch Umbilical Tower as the much larger Saturn V. Three crewed flights to Skylab, and the Apollo launch for the Apollo–Soyuz Test Project, were conducted from the ML-1 using the Milkstool.

Prior to the scrapping of the LUT in 2004, there was a campaign to rebuild and preserve it as a memorial to Project Apollo. The crew access arm is preserved at the Kennedy Space Center Visitor Complex on the upper level of the gift shop.

Following the launch of Apollo-Soyuz, ML-1 was the last Mobile Launcher to be converted for use by the Space Shuttle. The LUT and Milkstool were dismantled and placed into storage, and the base of the launch platform was modified to accommodate the locations of engines on the shuttle. The platform was redesignated MLP-3.

In total, MLP-3 was used for 29 Shuttle launches, starting in 1990. It was the least used of the three MLPs. Following the Space Shuttle retirement, NASA kept the MLP-3 for solid-propellant rockets.

Usage of MLP-3 to launch the OmegA rocket was granted to Orbital ATK (later bought out by Northrop Grumman) following discussions in 2016, and later formalized through a Reimbursable Space Act Agreement in August 2019. Under the Agreement, Vehicle Assembly Building High Bay 2 would be used to assemble the rocket, while MLP-3 and crawler-transporter 1 would be used to move the rocket to LC-39B for launch. From 2019 to 2020, the OmegA launch tower was under construction on MLP-3. Following the cancellation of OmegA in September 2020, work began to demolish the half-completed launch tower. As of January 2021, MLP-3 is planned to be placed in storage in High Bay 2 of the Vehicle Assembly Building. In 2023, MLP-3 was demolished to make room in High Bay 2 for other NASA operations.

=== Space Launch System ===
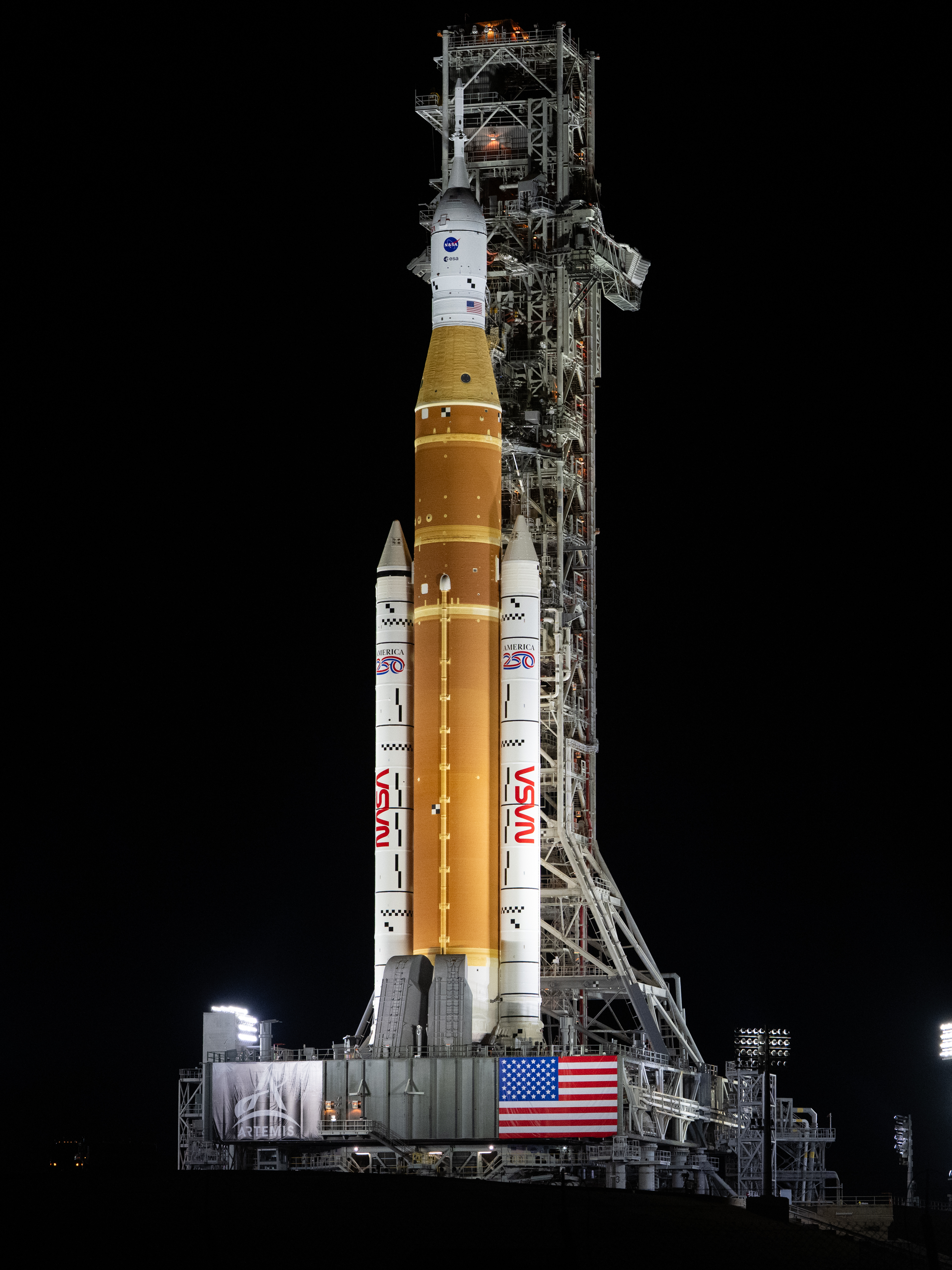
The SLS rocket for Artemis II atop ML-1 at Launch Complex 39B in January 2026

Between 2009 and 2010, a mobile launcher platform known as Mobile Launcher-1 (ML-1) was constructed as part of the Constellation program. Following the program's cancellation in 2010, ML-1 was repurposed for the Space Launch System (SLS) Block 1 configuration, with modifications carried out between 2013 and 2018. The total cost of ML-1 is estimated at approximately $1 billion.

The most significant modification to ML-1 involved the platform’s base, where engineers enlarged a 22-square-foot (2 m^{2}) exhaust duct into a rectangular opening measuring 60 by 30 feet (18.3 by 9.1 m) and reinforced the surrounding structure. These changes were required, because SLS produces substantially greater thrust than the originally planned Ares I rocket, featuring two solid rocket boosters and a core stage powered by four RS-25 engines. The ML-1 base is 25 feet (7.6 m) high, 158 feet (48 m) long, and 133 feet (41 m) wide. The launcher also includes a 355-foot-tall (108 m) Launch Umbilical Tower equipped with multiple swing arms used to service the vehicle prior to launch.

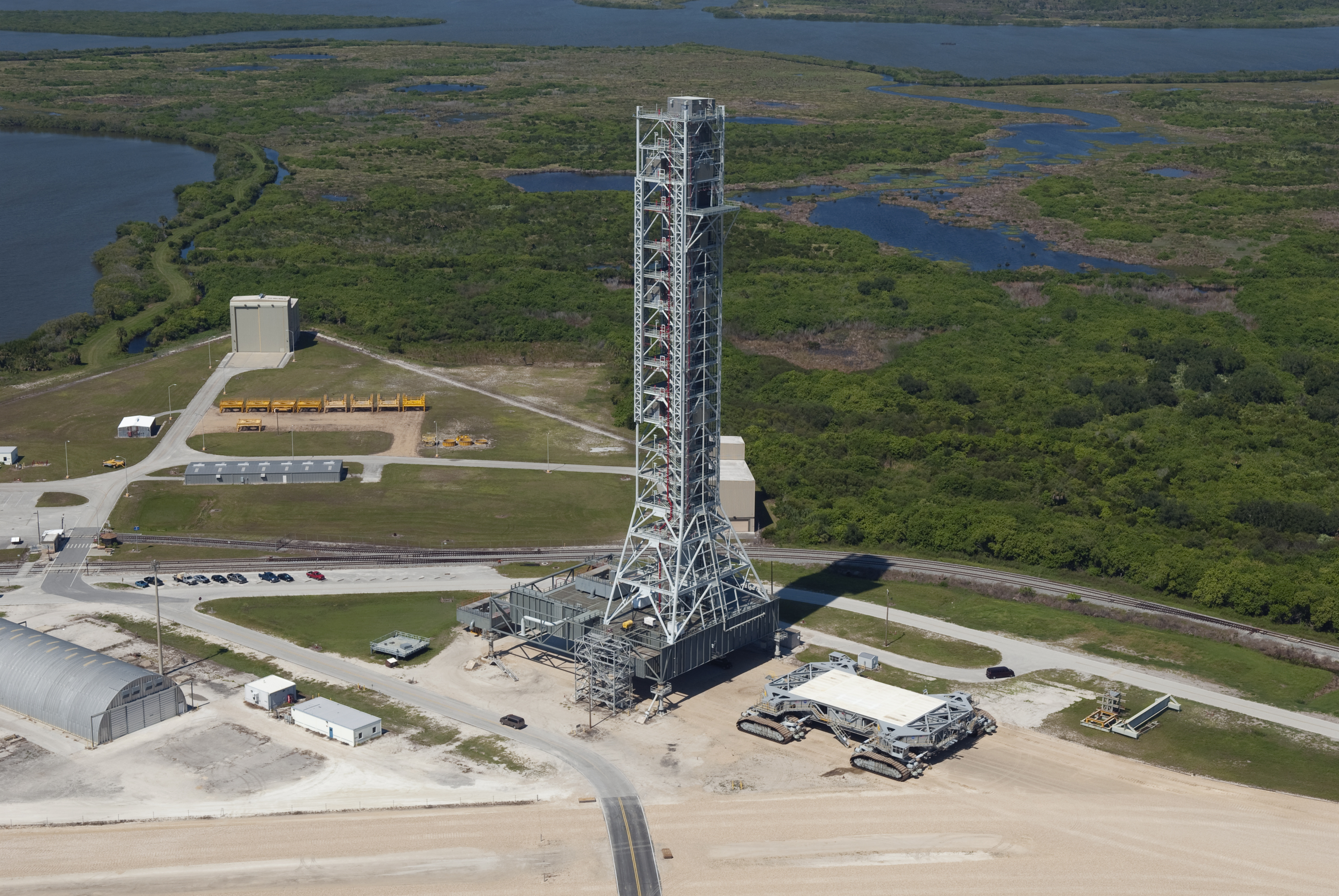
ML-1 in its original Constellation program configuration, outside the VAB in October 2010

In June 2019, NASA awarded a contract to Bechtel for the design and construction of Mobile Launcher-2 (ML-2), intended to support the taller SLS Block 1B and planned Block 2 variants. These configurations incorporated the Exploration Upper Stage (EUS), requiring a higher crew access arm and redesigned umbilical arms. Construction of ML-2 began in 2020, with an initial completion target of 2023. The project was originally estimated to cost under $500 million; however, costs increased substantially over time, with NASA establishing a baseline of $1.8 billion in 2024 and the NASA Office of Inspector General projecting that total costs could reach as much as $2.7 billion.

By early 2026, more than $1 billion had been spent, and ML-2 was estimated to be approximately 90 percent complete. In February 2026, NASA cancelled the SLS Block 1B and Block 2 variants, eliminating the primary need for ML-2 and rendering it surplus to the Artemis program. Amid continued delays and cost growth, NASA announced in March 2026 that it no longer planned to use the launcher. On March 29, 2026, the agency confirmed that a stop-work order had been issued to Bechtel, halting construction. Components common to ML-1 subsequently began to be removed from ML-2 for use as spares.

== Cape Canaveral ==
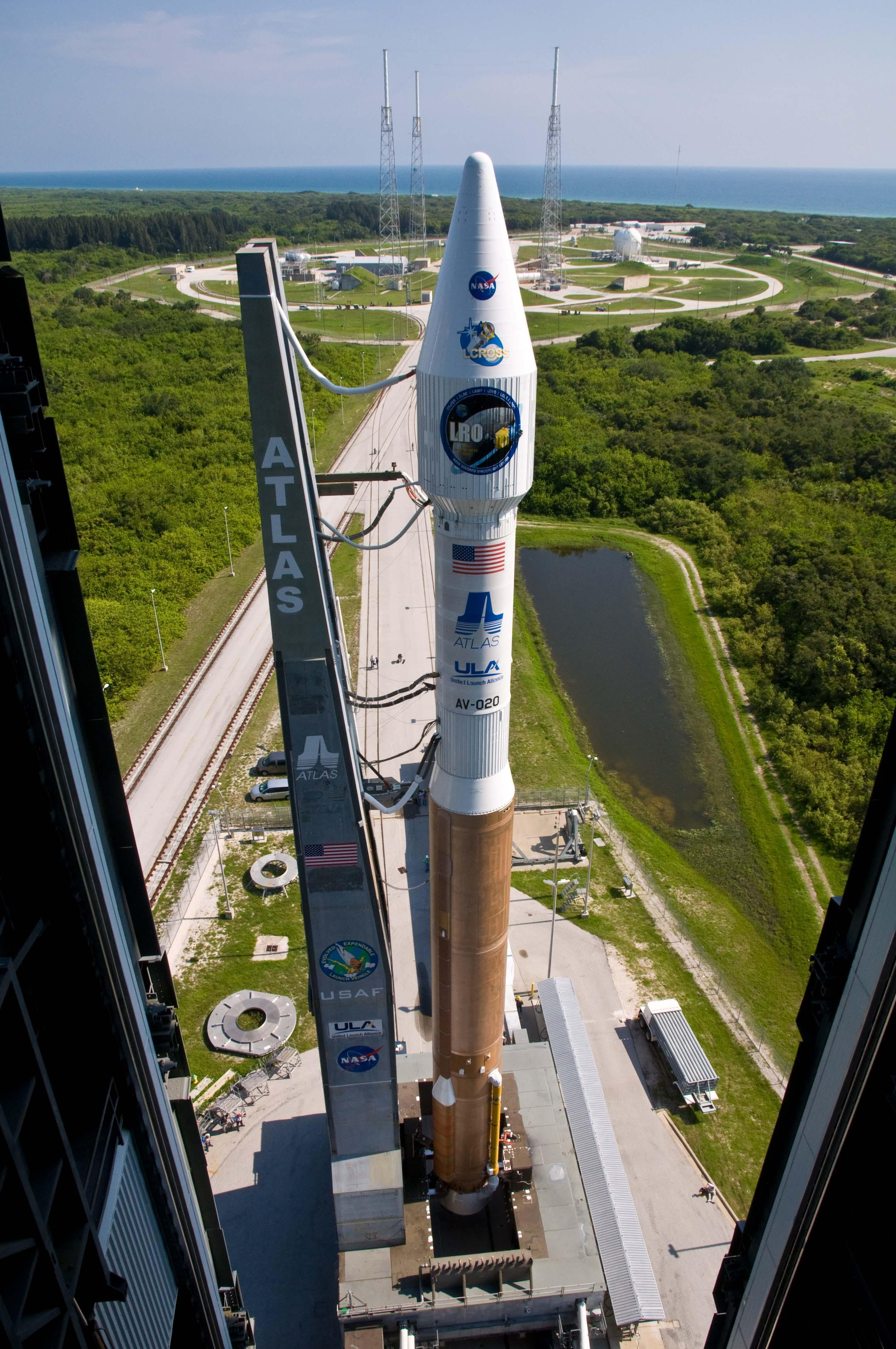
An Atlas V rolls out to SLC-41

=== Atlas V ===
ULA's Atlas V utilizes a mobile launcher platform (MLP) when launching from SLC-41. The rocket is stacked on its MLP in the 280-foot-tall (85.4 m) Vertical Integration Facility (VIF), and is then rolled-out over 600 yards (550 m) to the launch pad. The design of this MLP is derived from the MLPs used by the Titan III and IV rockets.

=== Titan III and Titan IV ===
Titan III and Titan IV rockets launched from SLC-40 and SLC-41 utilized MLPs to decouple assembly of the launch vehicle from launch. This was meant to enable simultaneous assembly of multiple launch vehicles as part of the Titan's Integrate-Transfer-Launch (ITL) concept, allowing a high flight rate from a small number of launch pads.

=== Vulcan Centaur ===
ULA's Vulcan Centaur rocket uses MLPs similar in design to the Atlas V platform at SLC-41, modified to accommodate Vulcan’s larger size. Each of the two Vulcan Launch Platforms (VLPs) stands 183 feet (56 m) tall and weighs approximately 1.3 million pounds (590 tonnes). The platforms are equipped with electronics, cables, and umbilicals to support and control the rocket, supplying liquefied natural gas and liquid oxygen to the Vulcan first stage, and liquid hydrogen and liquid oxygen to the Centaur V upper stage. Rockets are stacked on a VLP inside one of two nearby Vertical Integration Facilities (VIFs). Once the vehicle is fully assembled, the VLP is towed to the launch pad on rails using road–rail vehicles, where it is connected to a fixed tower equipped with a crew access arm for human spaceflight missions.

== Other uses ==
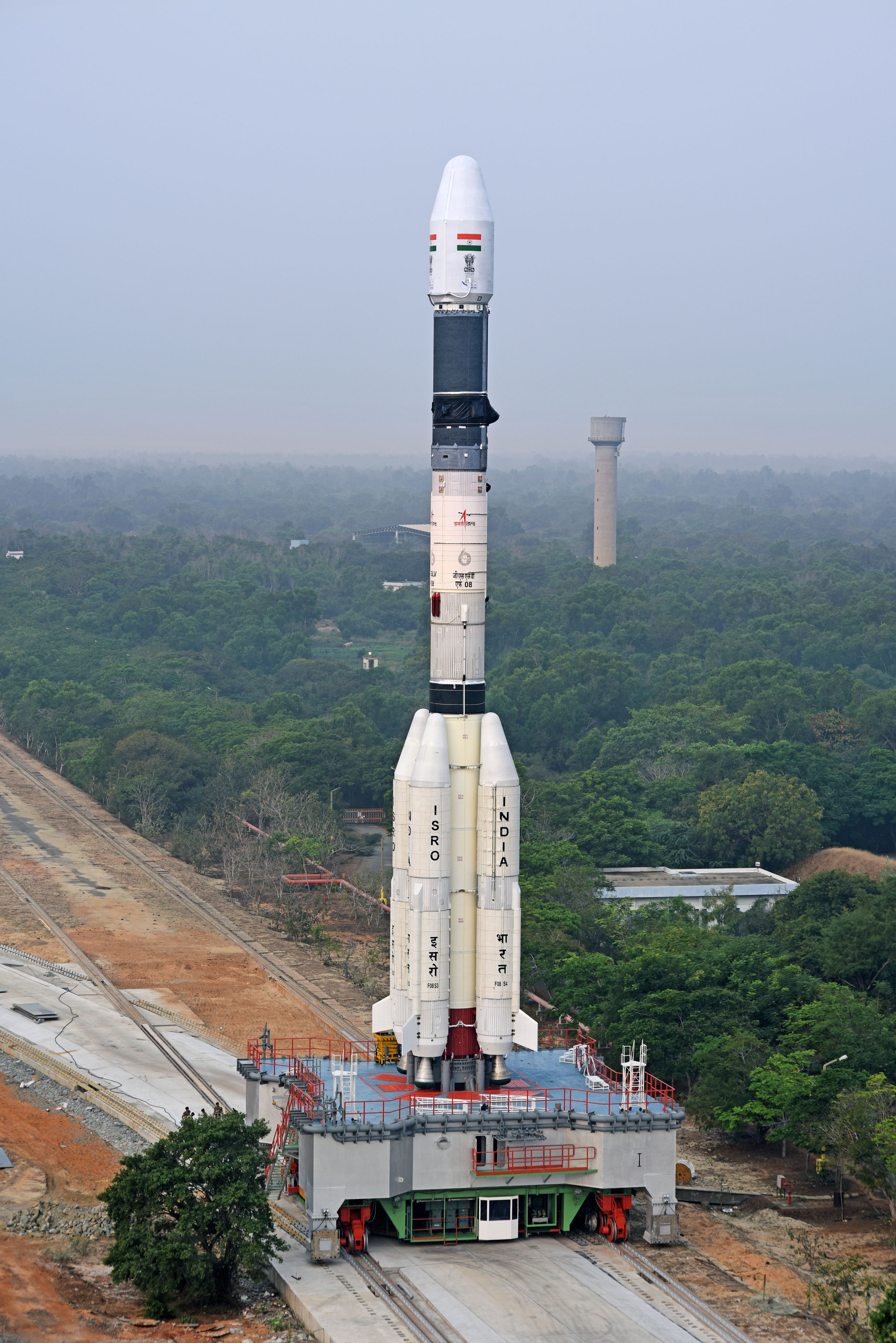
A GSLV rocket is carried atop the Mobile Launch Pedestal to the Second Launch Pad

Japan's H3 (and previously H-IIA and H-IIB) rockets utilize an MLP to launch from the Yoshinobu Launch Complex.

India's PSLV, GSLV, and GSLV Mark III rockets utilize the Mobile Launch Pedestal. The rockets are stacked on the Mobile Launch Pedestal in the Vehicle Assembly Building, and are then rolled-out towards the launch pad.

Several rockets from the Ariane family use a MLP. The first one was the Ariane 4, replacing the assembly on a pad used by previous Ariane rockets with a purpose-built 80-metre (260 ft) tall vertical assembly hall and a special railway to the launch pad. The follow-on Ariane 5 also used a similar system, with the Launcher Integration Building (BIL) handling assembly of the rocket, and the Final Assembly Building (BAF) mating it with the payload, before the completed rocket gets transferred to the Launch Zone (ZL) for liftoff.

== Sound suppression system ==
Once delivered to the pad, the mobile launcher platform is connected to the larger sound suppression system by large pipes which deliver a deluge of water from an adjacent water tower. Six 12-foot-high (3.7 m) towers known as "rainbirds" spray water over the MLP and into the flame deflector trenches below it, absorbing acoustic waves. The suppression system reduced the acoustic sound level to approximately 142 dB.
