= NASA standard detonator =

Schematic of the NSD body attached to the NASA Standard Initiator (NSI), an electric initiator device.

The NASA Standard Detonator (NSD) is a device used by NASA for applications where a charge must be detonated, usually in conjunction with frangible nuts as a release mechanism. NSDs have been used since the Gemini program, and were used for the Space Shuttle program, including the Solid Rocket Booster (SRB) separation from the External Tank, as well as the SRB Range Safety System. Chemring (formerly Hi-Shear) is the primary provider for the NSDs which were used on the Space Shuttle.

== See also ==
- NASA Standard Initiator
