= National Soccer League (disambiguation) =

National Soccer League is a defunct national association football league in Australia which was in operation from 1977 to 2004

National Soccer League may also refer to:

- National Soccer League (Canada), a central Canadian soccer league from 1926 to 1993, renamed the Canadian National Soccer League
- National Soccer League (Chicago), 1928–present
- National Soccer League of New York, 1920s–1950s
- National Soccer League (indoor), a proposed indoor league in the U.S., 2004–2008
- National Soccer League (South Africa), 1985–1995
- Papua New Guinea National Soccer League, top-level football league of Papua New Guinea

== See also ==
- NSL (disambiguation)
- National Indoor Soccer League
- New Zealand National Soccer League
- Women's National Soccer League, Australia
