= Vehicle Assembly Building =

Spacecraft assembly building operated by NASA at the Kennedy Space Center

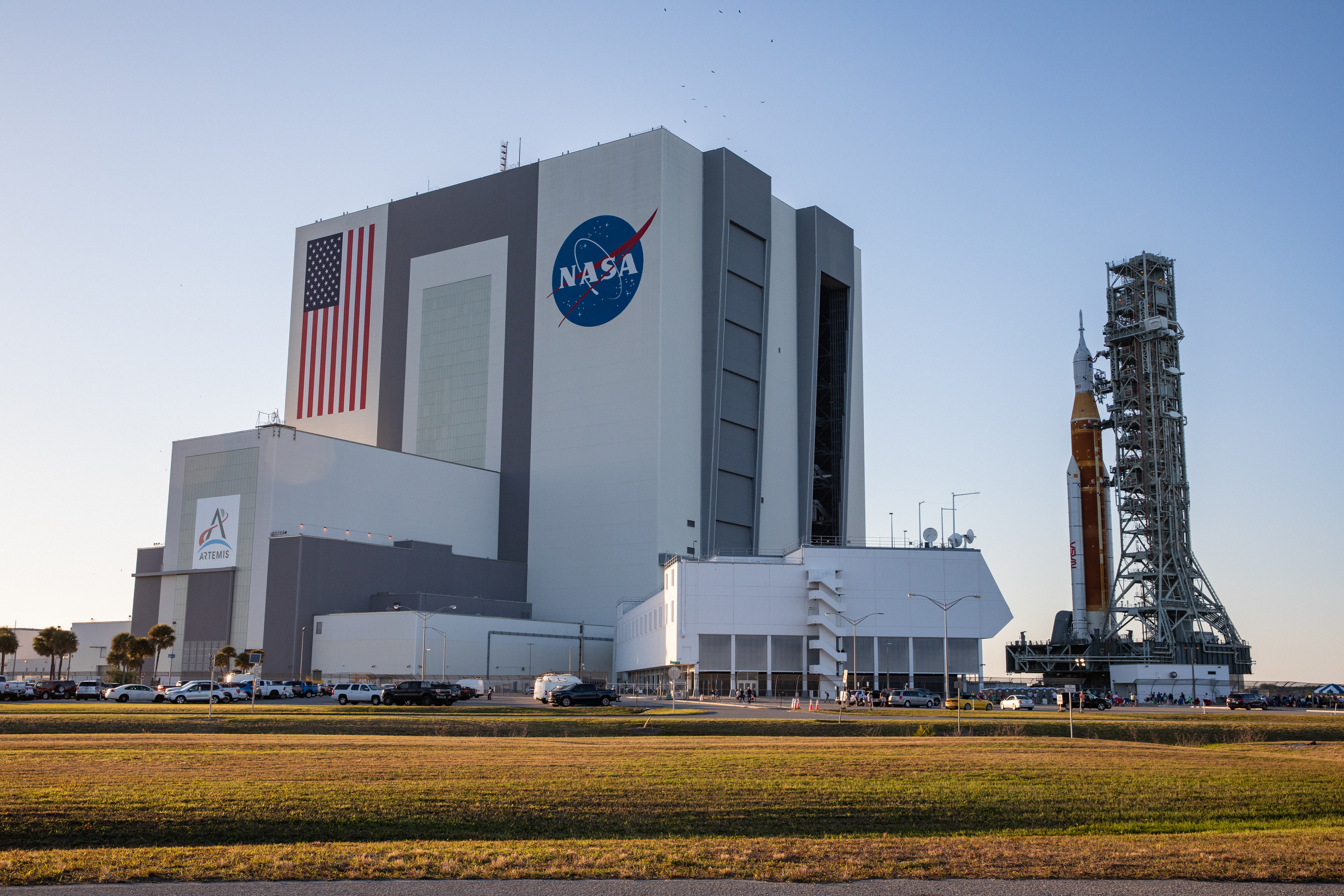
- The Artemis I Space Launch System vehicle rolling out from the VAB at Kennedy Space Center

- Location within Florida Location within the United States
- Former names: Vertical Assembly Building

General information
- Type: Integration facility
- Location: Brevard County, Florida, United States
- Coordinates: 28°35′11″N 80°39′5″W
- Completed: 1966
- Owner: NASA

Height
- Height: 526 ft (160 m)

Dimensions
- Diameter: 716 ft × 518 ft (218 m × 158 m)

Technical details
- Floor count: 1
- Floor area: 8 acres (32,000 m^{2})

Design and construction
- Main contractor: Morrison-Knudsen
- Vehicle Assembly Building
- U.S. National Register of Historic Places
- Location: Kennedy Space Center Florida, U.S.
- Nearest city: Titusville
- Area: 8 acres (3 ha)
- Built: 1966
- Architect: https://www.urbahn.com
- Architectural style: Industrial
- MPS: John F. Kennedy Space Center MPS
- NRHP reference No.: 99001642
- Added to NRHP: January 21, 2000

The Vehicle Assembly Building (originally the Vertical Assembly Building), or VAB, is a large building at NASA's Kennedy Space Center (KSC) in Florida, designed to assemble large pre-manufactured space vehicle components, such as the massive Saturn V, the Space Shuttle and the Space Launch System, and stack them vertically onto one of three mobile launcher platforms used by NASA. As of March 2022, the first Space Launch System (SLS) rocket was assembled inside in preparation for the Artemis I mission, launched on November 16, 2022.

At 129,428,000 ft^{3} (3,665,000 m^{3}), it is the eighth-largest building in the world by volume as of 2022. The building is at Launch Complex 39 at KSC, 149 miles (240 km) south of Jacksonville, 219 miles (352 km) north of Miami, and 50 miles (80 km) due east of Orlando, on Merritt Island on the Atlantic coast of Florida.

The VAB is the largest single-story building in the world, was the tallest building (526 ft or 160 m) in Florida until 1974, and is the tallest building in the United States outside an urban area.

== History ==
The VAB, completed in 1966, was originally built for the vertical assembly of the Apollo–Saturn V space vehicle and was originally referred to as the Vertical Assembly Building. In anticipation of post-Apollo projects such as the Space Shuttle program, it was renamed the Vehicle Assembly Building on February 3, 1965. It was subsequently used to mate the Space Shuttle orbiters to their external fuel tanks and solid rocket boosters. Once the complete space vehicle was assembled on a mobile launcher platform, a crawler-transporter moved it to Launch Complex-39A or 39B.

The building was designed with future expansion in mind but ultimately ended up being larger than NASA would ever need. Initially, during the planning of Kennedy Space Center, as many as five launch pads were proposed, and designs for a six-bay VAB were drawn up. However, as the plans were scaled back to just two launch pads, the VAB was reduced to four bays. The contractors built the VAB to accommodate potential expansion to six bays, but such expansion was never required. In fact, only three bays were ever connected to the crawlerway. Bay 2, located on the west side of the building (farther from the launch pads), saw limited use during the Saturn V era and was eventually converted into a storage area for the Shuttle program.

Before the destruction of Space Shuttle Columbia in 2003, NASA installed a sub-roof inside the VAB to deal with falling concrete debris due to the building's age.

The VAB was designated as a National Historic Civil Engineering Landmark by the American Society of Civil Engineers in 2020.

== Construction ==
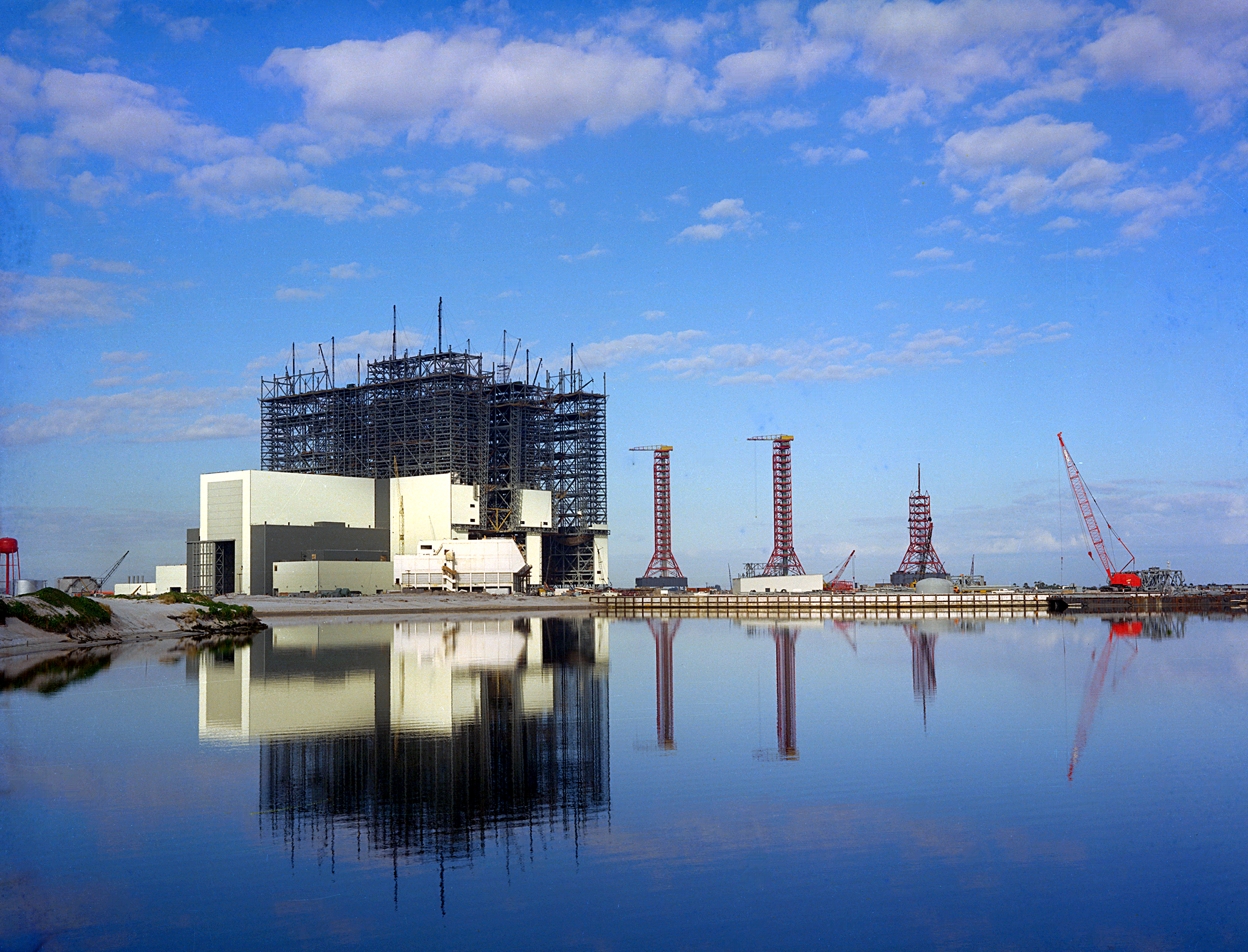
VAB during construction (1965) with the three mobile launchers for the Saturn V rocket.

In 1963, NASA contracted Urbahn Architects to design and build the VAB as part of NASA's effort to send astronauts to the Moon for the Apollo program. Construction began with driving the first steel foundation piles on Aug. 2, 1963. Altogether, 4,225 pilings were driven down 164 feet (50 m) to bedrock with a foundation consisting of 30,000 cubic yards (23,000 m^{3}) of concrete. Construction of the VAB required 98,590 short tons (197,180,000 lb; 89,440,000 kg) of steel. The building was completed in 1966. The VAB is 526 feet (160.3 m) tall, 716 feet (218.2 m) long and 518 feet (157.9 m) wide. It covers 8 acres (32,000 m^{2}), and encloses 129,428,000 cubic feet (3,665,000 m^{3}) of space. Located on Florida's Atlantic coast, the building was constructed to withstand hurricanes and tropical storms. Despite this, it has received damage from several hurricanes (see below).

== Capabilities ==
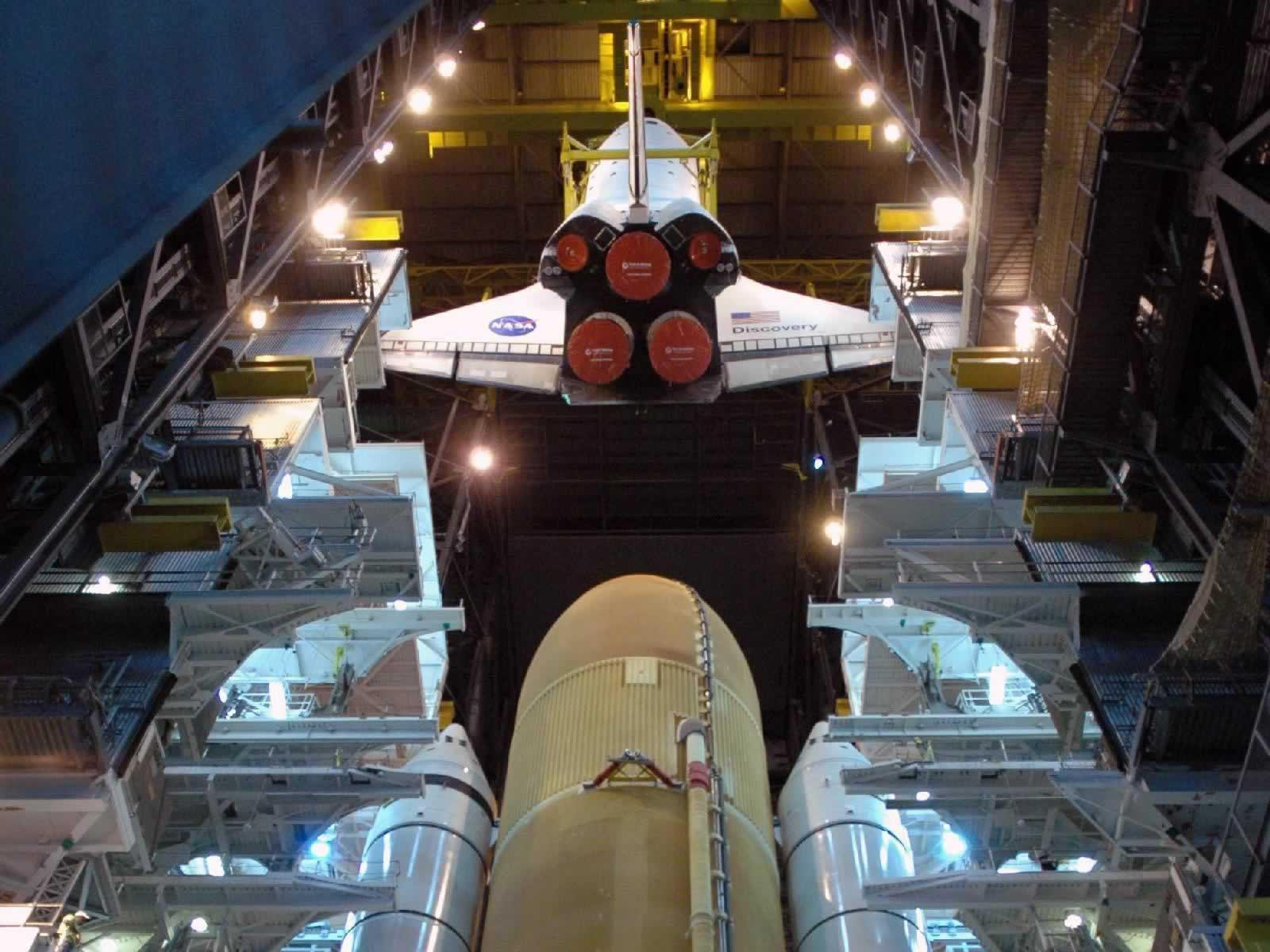
A crane lowers Discovery toward the ET and SRBs in high bay 3 of the Vehicle Assembly Building for STS-124.

The north end of the Vehicle Assembly Building (VAB) contains four “high bays” designed as enclosed, protected spaces for stacking rocket stages, payloads, and other components vertically on a mobile launcher platform. This configuration mirrors how the rocket will stand on the launch pad. Components and stages typically enter the VAB through the south side, which houses eight "low bays" used for storage and pre-assembly preparations. Platforms in both the high and low bays can be adjusted to provide crews safe access to all parts of the rocket. A 92-foot-wide (28 m) transfer aisle runs the length of the building.

The VAB is equipped with five overhead cranes, including two capable of lifting up to 325 tons, as well as 136 additional lifting devices. These systems enable precise handling and assembly of heavy components. Once the launch vehicle is fully assembled and tested, a crawler-transporter enters the VAB, lifts the mobile launch platform with the attached spacecraft, and transports it to the launch pad.

Each high bay features a massive door—the largest in the world—standing 456 feet (139 m) tall. Each door comprises seven vertical panels and four horizontal panels and takes about 45 minutes to open or close.

To manage internal conditions, the VAB is equipped with air conditioning, including 125 ventilators on the roof and four large air handlers located west of the building. The system provides a combined 10,000 tons of refrigeration (120,000,000 BTU/hr, 35 MW), not to cool the building, but to control moisture. The air inside the building can be completely replaced every hour. When the building's large doors are opened, fog can enter and linger, leading to incorrect but persistent rumors that the VAB generates its own weather or forms clouds.

== Exterior ==
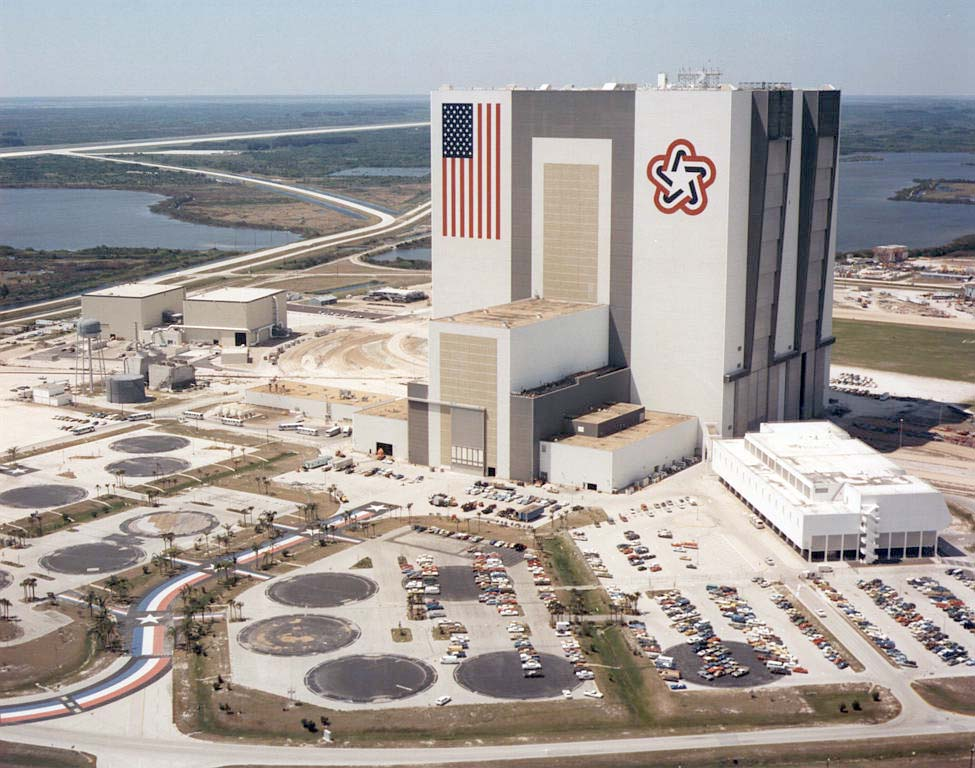
VAB in 1977, with the Bicentennial Star opposite the flag. The Bicentennial Star was painted over with the NASA insignia in 1998. Note the Space Shuttle Landing Facility at upper left.

The American flag painted on the building was the largest in the world when added in 1976 as part of United States Bicentennial celebrations, along with the star logo of the anniversary, later replaced by the NASA insignia in 1998. It is 209 feet (63.7 m) high and 110 feet (33.5 m) wide. Each of the stars on the flag is 6 feet (1.83 m) across, the blue field is the size of a regulation basketball court, and each of the stripes is 9 feet (2.74 m) wide. Work began in early 2007 to restore the exterior paint on the immense facility. Special attention was paid to the enormous American flag and NASA "meatball" insignia. The work repaired visible damage from years of storms and weathering. The flag and logo had been previously repainted in 1998 for NASA's 40th anniversary.

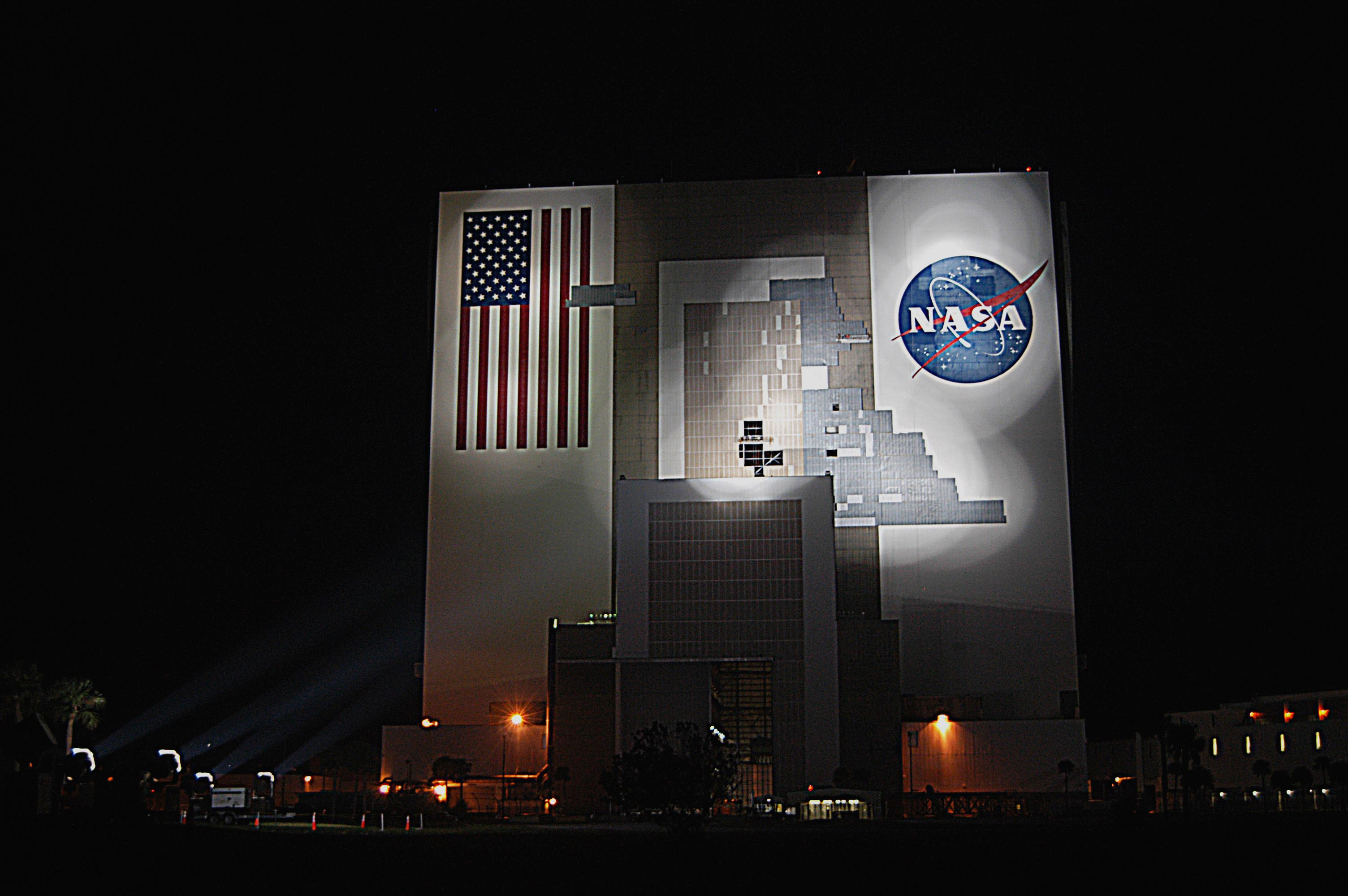
Repair work after Hurricane Frances

The most extensive exterior damage occurred during the storm season of 2004, when Hurricane Frances blew off 850 14-by-6-foot (4.3 m × 1.8 m) aluminum panels from the building, resulting in about 40,000 square feet (3,700 m^{2}) of new openings in the sides. Twenty-five additional panels were blown off the east side by the winds from Hurricane Jeanne just three weeks later. Earlier in the season, Hurricane Charley caused significant but less serious damage, estimated to cost $700,000 to repair. Damage caused by these hurricanes was still visible in 2007. Some of these panels are "punch-outs", designed to detach from the VAB when a large pressure differential is created on the outside vs. the inside. This allows for equalization, and helps protect the structural integrity of the building during rapid changes in pressure such as in tropical cyclones.

The building has been used as a backdrop in several Hollywood movies including Marooned, SpaceCamp, Apollo 13, Contact, and others.

== Future ==
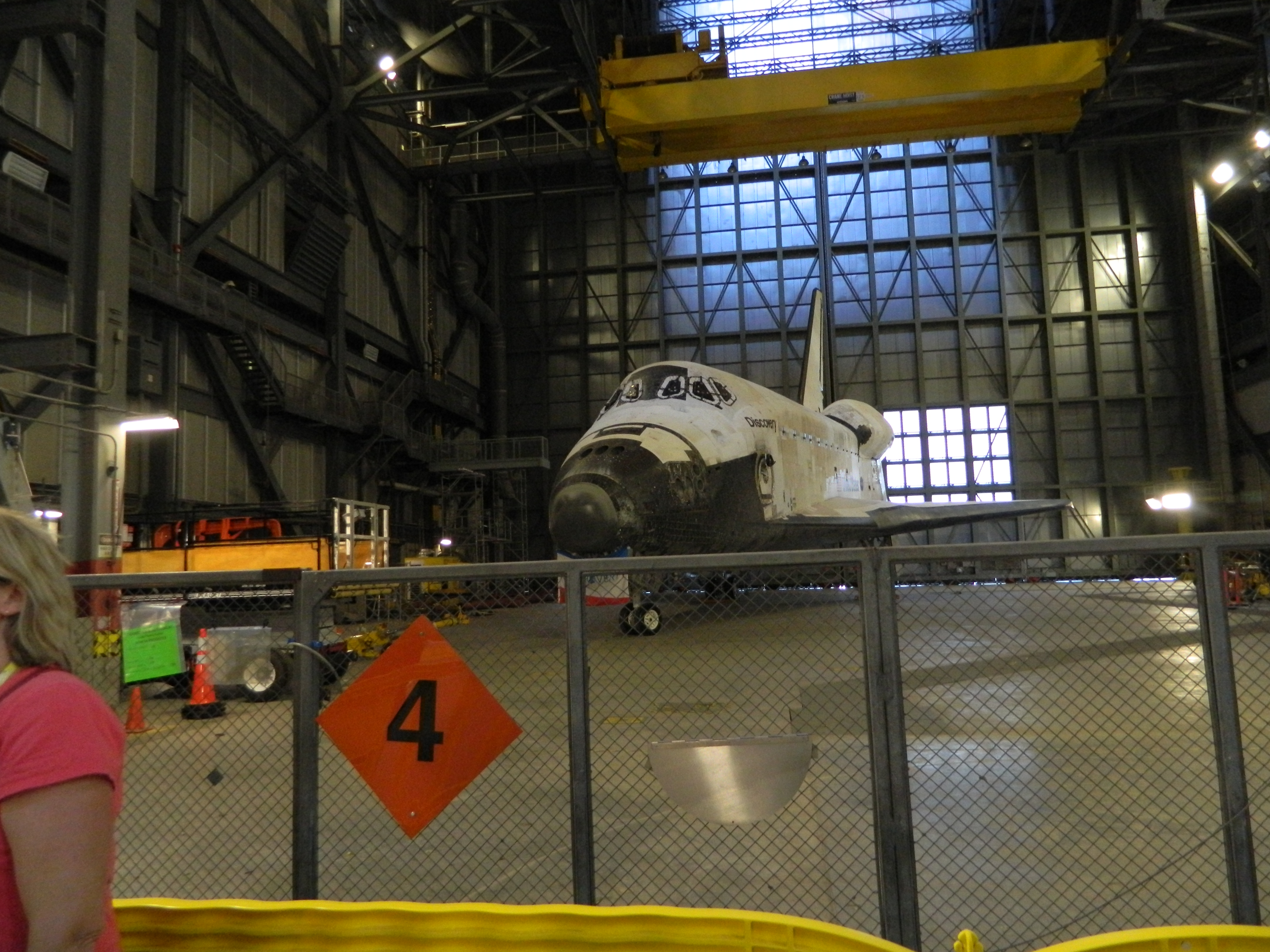
Discovery in the Vehicle Assembly Building waiting for a ferry flight to Dulles, Virginia, for permanent display at the Smithsonian's National Air and Space Museum.

Originally, after the Space Shuttle was intended to be retired in 2010, the VAB would have been renovated for stacking of the Ares I and Ares V launch vehicles for the Constellation program; however, the Constellation program was cancelled in 2010. The Space Shuttle itself was retired in 2011, after which NASA temporarily (as early as 2012) offered public tours of the VAB. These tours were temporarily discontinued in February 2014 to allow for renovations to take place.

The NASA FY2013 budget included US$143.7 million for Construction of Facilities (CoF) requirements in support of what is now known as the Artemis program and its vehicles, including the Space Launch System (SLS) and Orion spacecraft. NASA began modifying Launch Complex 39 at KSC to support the new SLS in 2014, beginning with major repairs, code upgrades and safety improvements to the Launch Control Center, Vehicle Assembly Building (VAB) and the VAB Utility Annex. This initial work is required to support any launch vehicle operated from Launch Complex 39 and will allow NASA to begin modernizing the facilities, while vehicle-specific requirements are being developed.

The VAB could be used to some extent for assembly and processing of any future vehicles using Launch Complex 39, in addition to renovations for SLS capabilities. On June 16, 2015, NASA released an announcement for proposals (AFP) seeking interest in using the VAB High Bay 2 and other complex facilities for commercial use in "assembling, integration, and testing of launch vehicles". This move is in line with the intent to migrate KSC towards acting as a spaceport accessible to both government and commercial ventures.

On April 21, 2016, NASA announced the selection of Orbital ATK (bought by Northrop Grumman as of 2019) to begin negotiations for High Bay 2. The "potential agreement" included an existing mobile launcher platform. NASA subsequently completed the agreement in August 2019 to lease High Bay 2 and Mobile Launcher Platform 3 to Northrop Grumman for use with their OmegA launch vehicle. However, development of OmegA was subsequently cancelled in September 2020. Northrop Grumman had yet to make any modifications to High Bay 2, and were using it for the storage of OmegA hardware. This hardware was scheduled to be removed from the VAB and returned to Northrop Grumman by the end of September 2020.

== Gallery ==
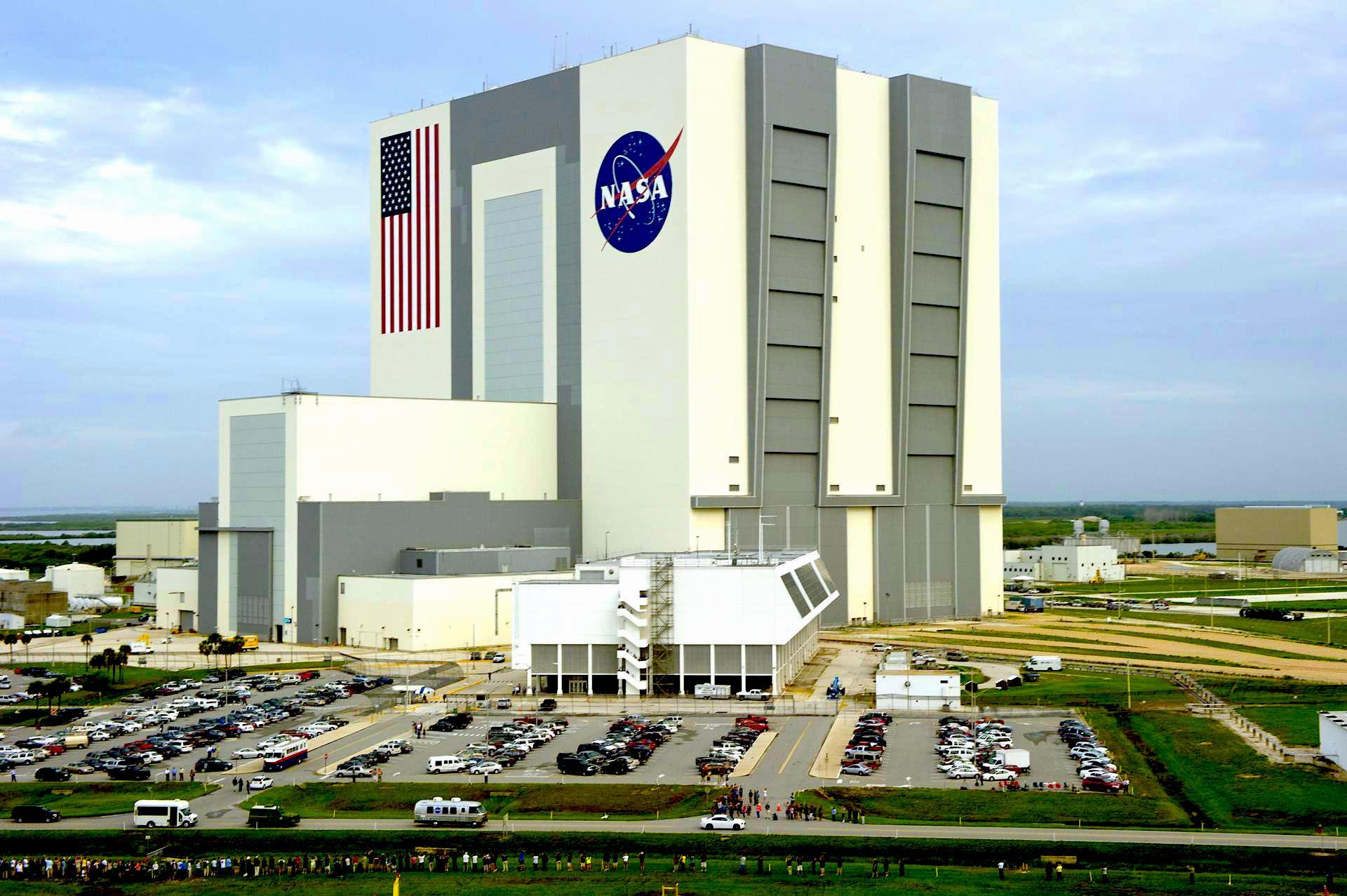
Aerial view of the Vehicle Assembly Building at Kennedy Space Center in 2011

The VAB in 2019

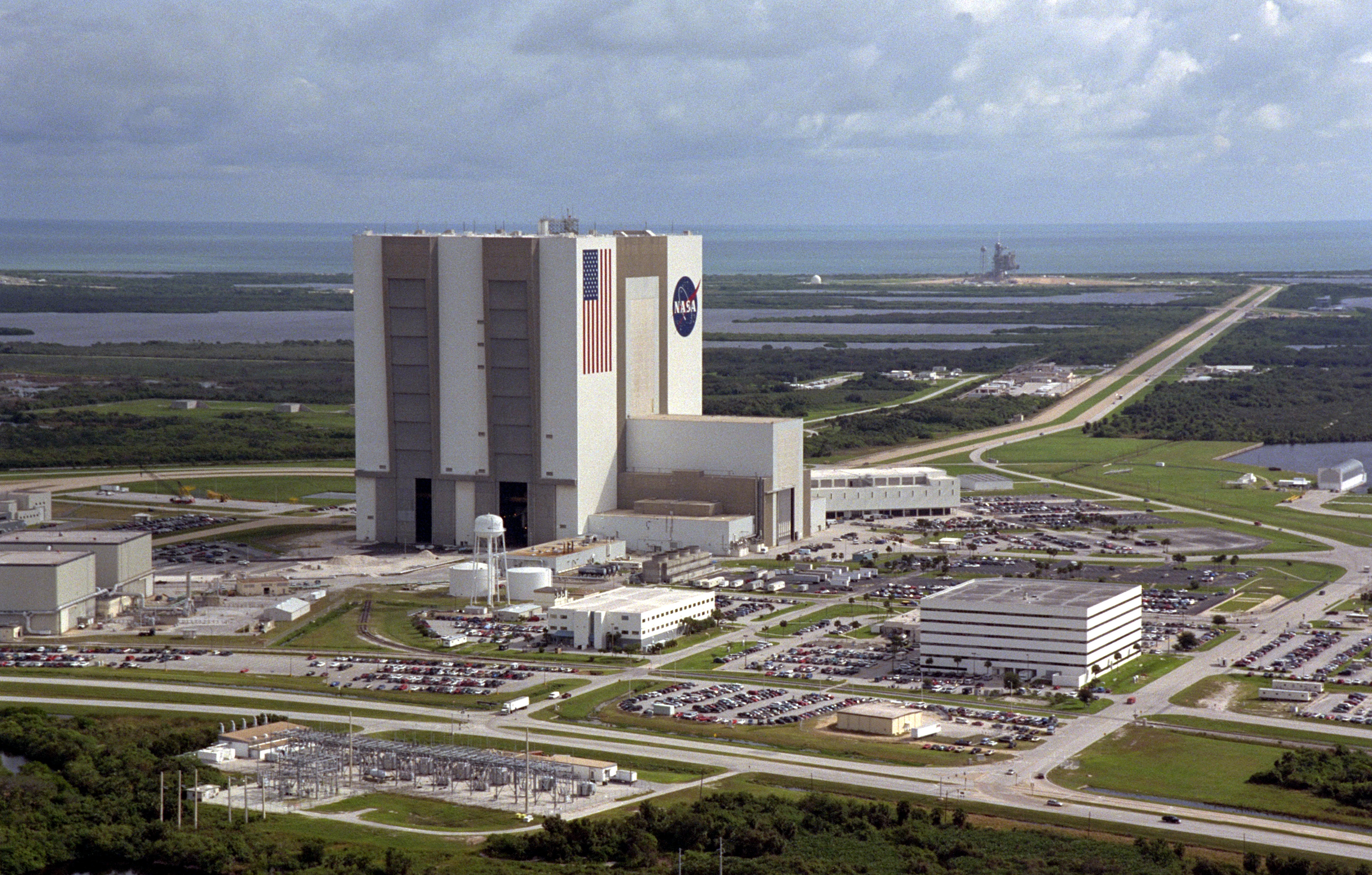
Overview of the VAB and LCC industrial area

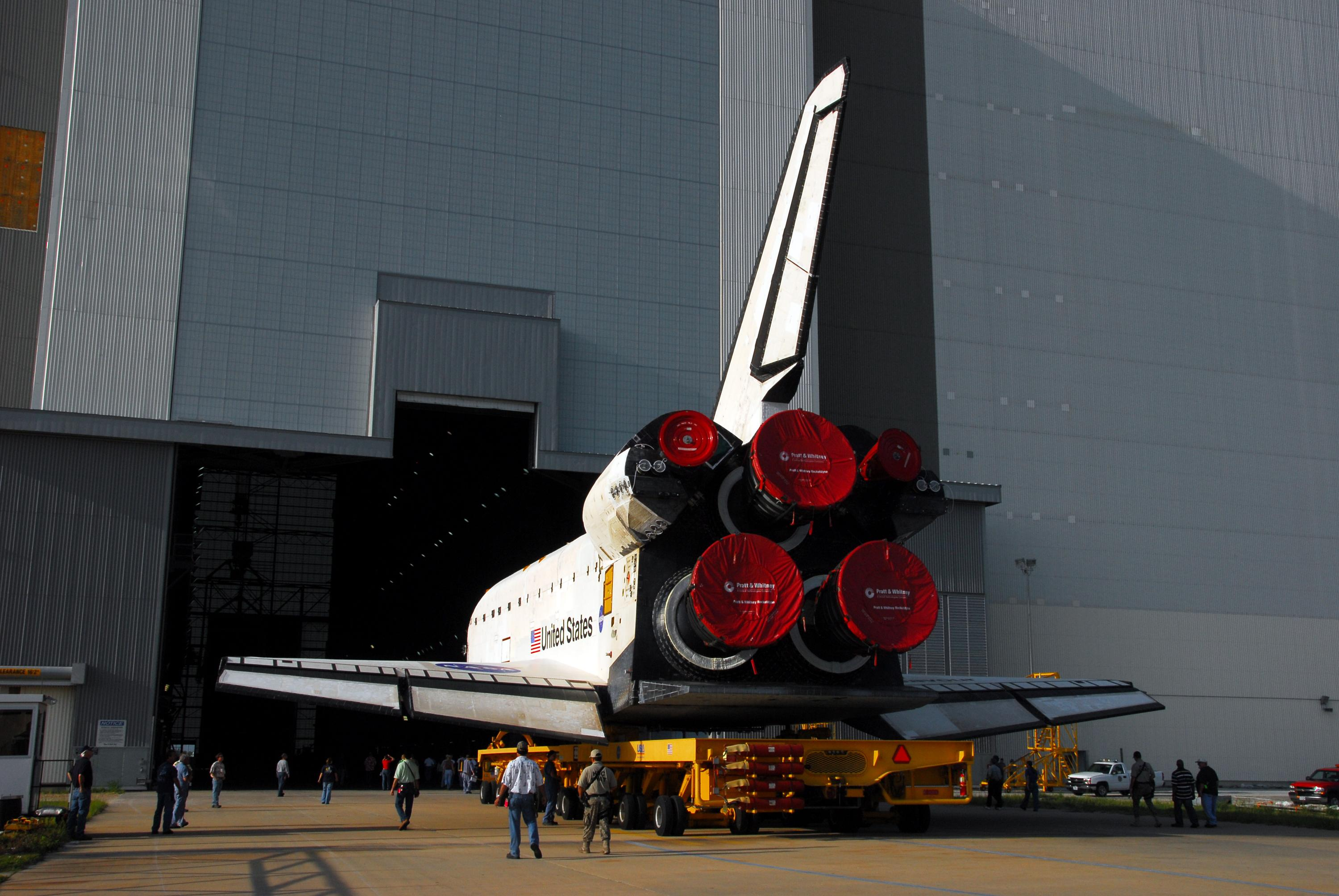
Endeavour on its way into the VAB during the launch preparations for STS-89. At the top of the doorway is the slot for the vertical stabilizer.

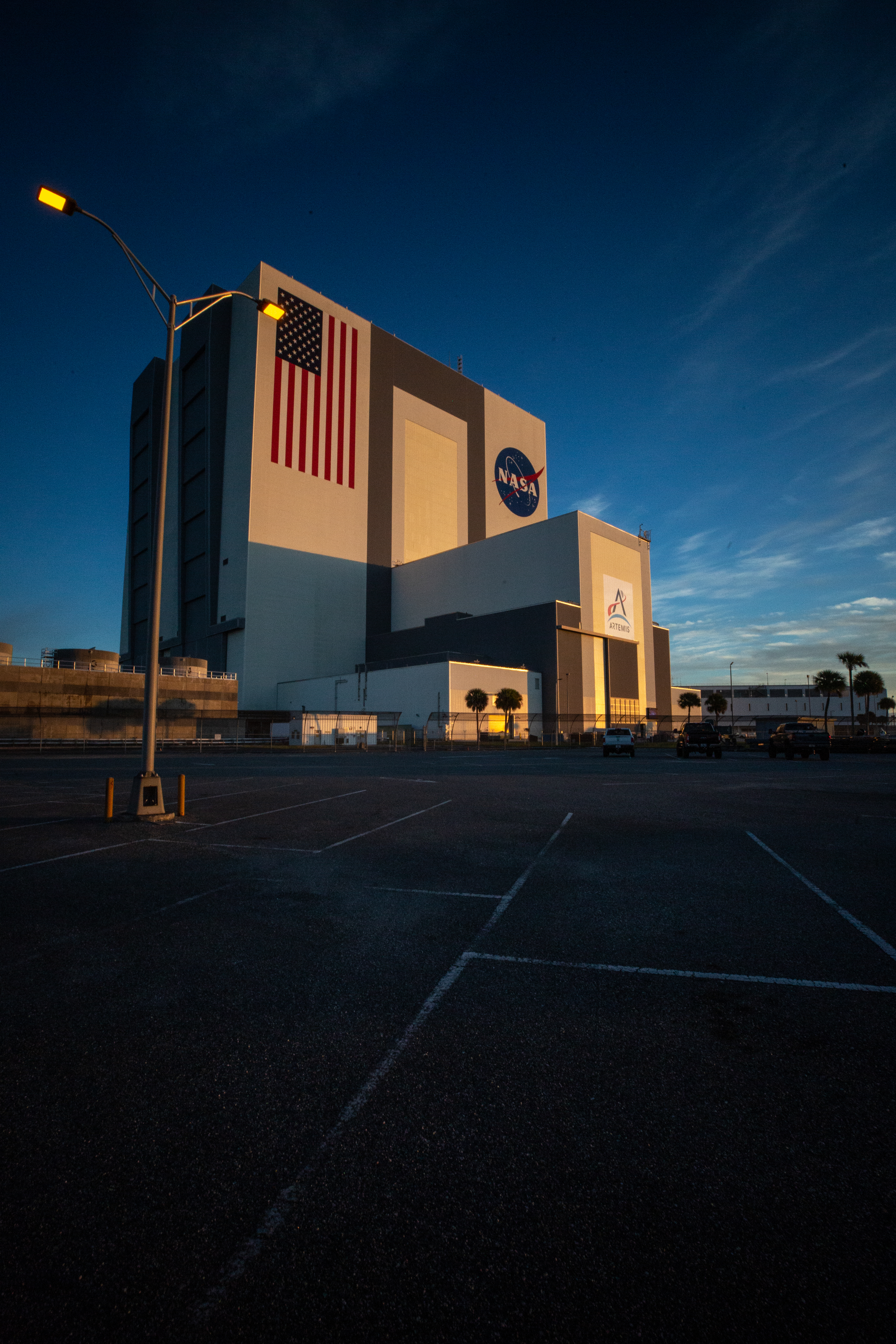
The VAB as viewed from the nearby parking lot, 19 January 2022

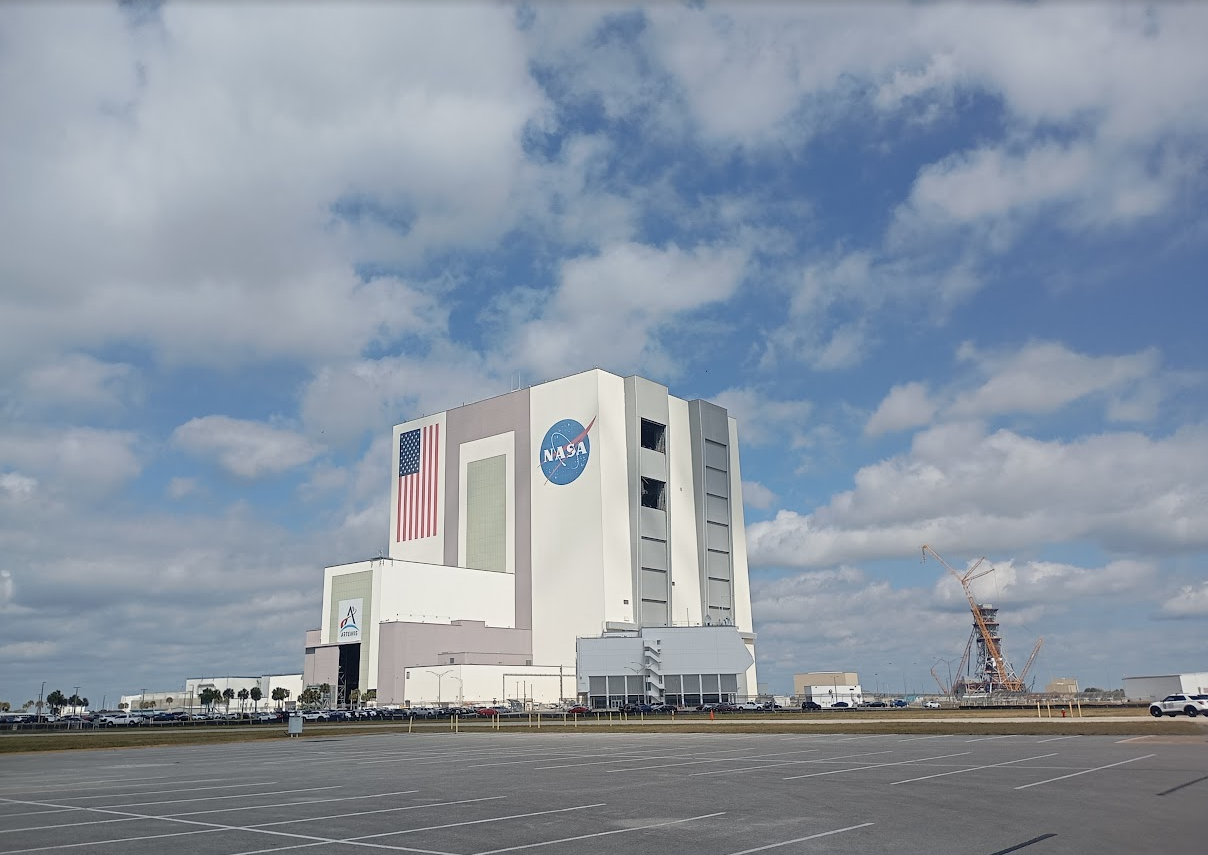
VAB in April 2025

Space Launch System Artemis 1 rollout out of the VAB, 17 March 2022

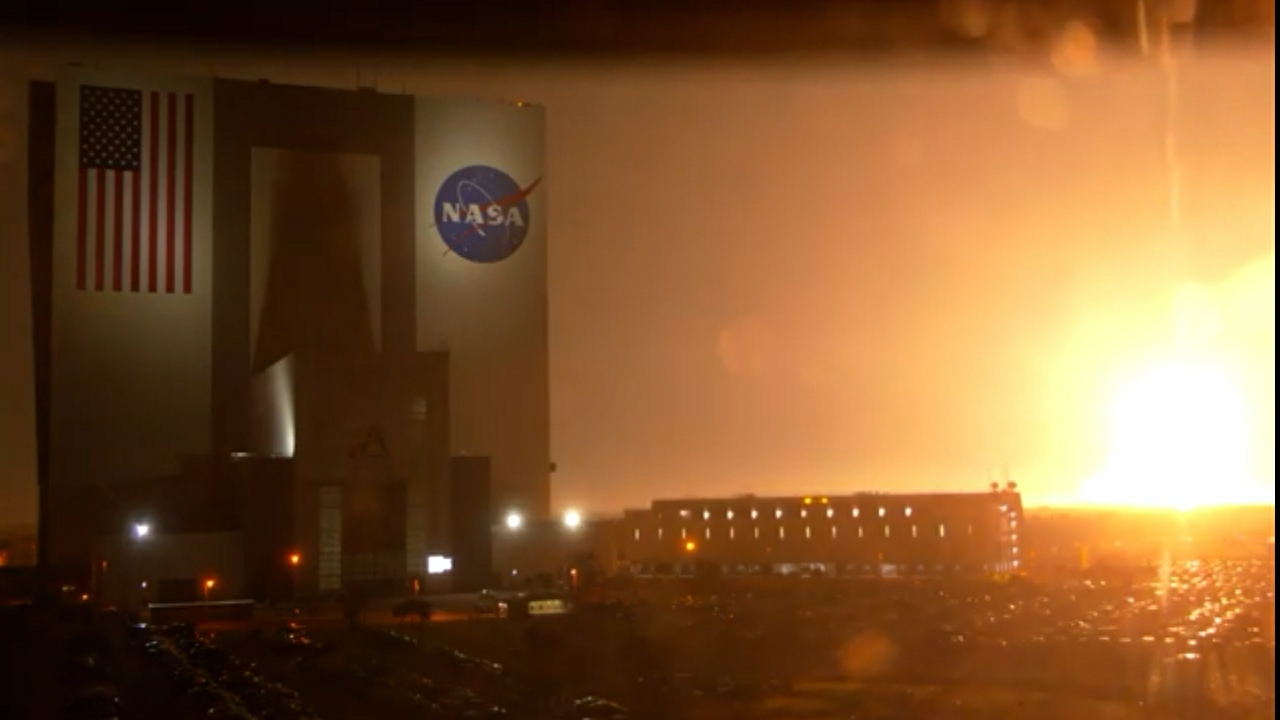
VAB Beside the SLS Block 1 Artemis 1 during the Launch, 16 November 2022

Records
Preceded by Miami-Dade County Courthouse	Tallest Building in Florida; 1965–1974; 520 feet (160 m)	Succeeded by Independent Life Building
