= NSEL =

NSEL may refer to:

- NSEL (networking), part of a Network Service Access Point address used in Open Systems Interconnection networking
- National Spot Exchange, a commodities exchange in India
  - NSEL case, a legal investigation
- Newmark Structural Engineering Laboratory, University of Illinois at Urbana-Champaign

== See also ==
- NSL (disambiguation)
