= Powered Descent Initiation =

Powered Descent Initiation (PDI) is a term used during the Apollo program Moon landing missions to describe the maneuver of the Apollo Lunar Module as it descended from lunar orbit to a rocket-powered landing.

"Eagle was GO to ignite its descent engine, and Armstrong and Aldrin locked their eyes to the glowing numbers displayed before them. They were almost at an invisible junction of height, speed, range, and time when everything would join together for commitment. When the instruments told them that they were 192 miles from their projected landing site, and were precisely 50,174 radar~measured feet above the long shadows of the moon, they would unleash decelerating thrust and begin slowing their speed for the touchdown.....this was it. PDI. Powered Descent Initiate."
