= Frangible nut =

Explosive fastener used to separate components, typically in aerospace

The frangible nut is a component used in many industries, but most commonly by NASA, to sever mechanical connections. It is, by definition, an explosively-splittable nut. The bolt remains intact while the nut itself is split into two or more parts.

== Space Shuttle ==
=== Solid rocket booster hold-down system ===
Frangible nuts secured the solid rocket boosters (SRB) of the Space Shuttle, which were bolted to the mobile launcher platform (MLP) until liftoff. On the Shuttle, they were separated using NASA standard detonators (NSDs) and explosive booster cartridges. The space shuttle used two NSDs and booster cartridges for the frangible nut atop each of the four 28-inch-long (71 cm), 3.5-inch-diameter (8.9 cm) studs holding each SRB to the MLP. Once detonation occurred, the shuttle lifted free of the MLP. The broken nut and any fragments from detonation were captured by energy absorption material, such as metal foam, enclosed in a blast container to prevent damage to the shuttle. In case of NSD failure, or incomplete clearance of the nut from the bolt, the SRB had ample thrust to break the bolt itself and launch unhindered.

At launch, two pyrotechnic, or explosive, devices "break" a frangible nut into two halves, allowing the stud, which is under high tension, to eject into the hold-down post system and release the space shuttle from the MLP. A number of factors work to slow or interrupt the stud’s ejection velocity. At liftoff, a stud not ejected prior to the first space shuttle movement, which occurs approximately 200—250 milliseconds after ignition, becomes bound and/or pinched and results in a hang-up.

Each frangible nut has two recesses 180 degrees apart, where a pyrotechnic device, or booster cartridge, and detonator are installed. At liftoff, each detonator receives a "fire" signal, which in turn initiates the booster cartridges, causing the frangible nut to fracture. Although only one is actually required to fire and break the frangible nut, two booster cartridges/detonators are used for redundancy. The difference in the booster cartridge function time of the two sides has been determined to decrease initial stud velocity and is determined to be a major contributor to stud hang-ups.

The frangible nut has been modified to incorporate a crossover assembly which pyrotechnically "links" the two booster cartridges/detonators in each frangible nut, resulting in detonation of both sides within 50 microseconds or less, versus a typical difference of approximately 250 microseconds experienced prior to this design modification. With the time reduction, a greater initial velocity is achieved, thereby reducing the probability of a stud hang-up. After completion of extensive component qualification and system certification testing to prove the design goal of 50 microseconds or less had been achieved, the crossover system design was approved for flight. The first flight using this new design occurred on STS-126. The crossover system was installed in all eight holddown locations on the solid rocket boosters.

=== External tank separation ===
Frangible nuts were also used for separation of the two aft structural attachments of the external tank prior to orbital insertion. The attach bolts were driven by the explosive force of the NSDs and a spring into a cavity in the tank strut. The nuts and all residual pieces of the NSDs were caught in a cover assembly within the shuttle.
