= Protein dispersibility index =

Measure of protein solubility

The Protein Dispersibility Index (PDI) is a means of comparing the solubility of a protein in water, and is widely used in the soybean product industry.

A sample of the soybeans are ground, mixed with a specific quantity of water, and the two are then blended together at a specific rpm for a specific time. The resulting mixture and original bean flour then have their protein content measured using a combustion test, and the PDI is calculated as the percentage of the protein in the mix divided by the percentage in the flour - a PDI of 100 therefore indicates total solubility.

It has been shown that the PDI can be affected, not only by the type of soybean used, but also by manufacturing processes - heat has been shown to lower the PDI.

The PDI required of a soyflour is dependent on the purpose to which the soybeans are to be put. Manufacturers of soymilk and tofu products want a high PDI to ensure the maximum protein content in their products. However, manufacturers of soy-based fish feed require a low PDI to avoid loss of valuable protein into the surrounding water.
