= NASA Standard Initiator =

Pyrotechnic device

The NASA Standard Initiator (NSI) is a pyrotechnic device used to set off other pyrotechnic devices. It is the central multi-purpose component of a modular system of detonating cords, pyrotechnics and various other explosive charges with many different uses.

The ignition charge of the device is a blend of zirconium, potassium perchlorate, Viton B and graphite, often abbreviated as ZPP.

Uses of the device include:

- Setting off pressure cartridges, pocket sized gas generators which in turn pneumatically activate other systems.
- Setting off the NASA standard detonator, which itself activates other systems explosively.
- Triggering Pyrotechnic Circuit Interrupters, severing bundles of electrical cables.
- Triggering explosive valves to open/close pressurization lines or fuel lines.
- Triggering a pyrotechnic pin puller which opens a Marman clamp, separating two spacecraft.
- Acting as an igniter.

== Development ==
The NASA Standard Initiator (NSI) was developed from the Single-Bridgewire Apollo Standard Initiator (SBASI) which was itself based on the Apollo Standard Initiator (ASI).

To provide additional redundancy and thus make the spacecraft more reliable, a double-bridgewire design was utilized, but during development of the Apollo Standard Initiator it was found that the original design responded unfavorably to RF frequencies. This resulted in a redesign with a single bridgewire which was approved in 1966. This new design introduced several other changes to improve resistance and give the device a longer shelf life, such as switching the material of the body from 17-4 PH steel to Inconel 718.
After the Apollo program ended, the Initiator was renamed and re-used on other spacecraft, such as the Space Shuttle.

== See also ==
- NASA standard detonator
