= Pyrotechnic composition =

Non-explosives producing heat, light and sound

A pyrotechnic composition is a substance or mixture of substances designed to produce an effect by heat, light, sound, gas/smoke or a combination of these, as a result of non-detonative self-sustaining exothermic chemical reactions. Pyrotechnic substances do not rely on oxygen from external sources to sustain the reaction.

== Types ==
Basic types of pyrotechnic compositions are:

- flash powder – burns very fast, produces explosions and/or bright flashes of light
- gunpowder – burns slower than flash powder, produces large amount of gases
- solid propellants – produce large amount of hot gases, used as sources of kinetic energy for rockets and projectiles
- pyrotechnic initiators – produce large amount of heat, flames, and/or hot sparks, used to ignite other compositions
- gas generators – produce large amount of gas, either high volume at short time (for actuators and ejection charges, often using solid propellants) or controlled flow rate (e.g. chemical oxygen generators, often using thermite-like compositions)
- ejection charges – burn fast, produce large amount of gas at short time, used to eject payloads from containers
- burst charges – burn fast, produce large amount of gas at short time, used to fragment a container and eject its content
- smoke compositions – burn slowly, produce smoke, plain or colored
- delay compositions – burn at constant slow speed, used to introduce delays into the firing train
- pyrotechnic heat sources – produce large amount of heat and little to no gases, slow-burning, often thermite-like compositions
- sparklers – producing white or colored sparks
- flares – burn slowly, produce high amount of light, used for illumination or signaling
- coloured fireworks compositions – produce light, white or colored

Some pyrotechnic compositions are used in industry and aerospace for generation of large volumes of gas in gas generators (e.g. in airbags), in pyrotechnic fasteners, and in other similar applications. They are also used in military pyrotechnics, when production of large amount of noise, light, or infrared radiation is required; e.g. missile decoy flares, flash powders, and stun grenades. A new class of reactive material compositions is now under investigation by military.

Many pyrotechnic compositions – especially involving aluminium and perchlorates – are often highly sensitive to friction, impact, and static electricity. Even as little as 0.1–10 millijoules spark can set off certain mixtures.

== Materials used ==
Pyrotechnic compositions are usually homogenized mixtures of small particles of fuels and oxidizers. The particles can be grains or flakes. Generally, the higher the surface area of the particles, the higher the reaction rate and burning speed. For some purposes, binders are used to turn the powder into a solid material.

=== Fuels ===
Typical fuels are based on metal or metalloid powders. A flash powder composition may specify multiple different fuels. Some fuels can also serve as binders. Common fuels include:

- Metals
  - Aluminium – most common fuel in many classes of mixtures, also a combustion instability suppressant. Less energy per mass than carbon but less gas evolution, retaining heat in the reaction mixture. High-temperature flame with solid particles, which interfere with flame colorants. Reacts with nitrates, except ammonium nitrate, yielding nitrogen oxides, ammonia, and heat (the reaction is slow at room temperature but violent at above 80 °C and may spontaneously ignite); the reaction can be inhibited by a weak acid, e.g. boric acid. Corroded by alkaline substances. Flake particles easier to ignite and better for pyrotechnics than spherical ones. In presence of moisture reacts with potassium chlorate and perchlorate, yielding hydrogen. Particle size selected according to the required burn rate.
  - Magnesium – more sensitive and violent than aluminium, increases probability of spontaneous ignition in storage. Used in fireworks to increase flame temperature. Less interference with flame color than aluminium.
  - Magnalium – aluminium-magnesium alloy, more stable and less expensive than magnesium; less reactive than magnesium, easier to ignite than aluminium
  - Iron – makes gold sparks, frequently used
  - Steel – an alloy of iron and carbon, makes branching yellow-orange sparks
  - Zirconium – produces hot particles, good for ignition mixtures, e.g. the NASA Standard Initiator, also a combustion instability suppressant
  - Titanium – produces hot particles, increases sensitivity to impact and friction; sometimes the Ti4Al6V alloy is used which gives a bit brighter white sparks; together with potassium perchlorate it is used in some pyrotechnic igniters; coarse powder produces branching blue-white sparks
  - Ferrotitanium – iron-titanium alloy, produces bright yellow-white sparks, used in pyrotechnic stars, rockets, comets, and fountains
  - Ferrosilicon – iron-silicon alloy, used in some mixtures, sometimes replacement of calcium silicide
  - Manganese – used to control burn rates, e.g. in delay compositions
  - Zinc – used in some smoke compositions, together with sulfur used in some early amateur rocket fuels, also in pyrotechnic stars; heavy, zinc-based compositions may require additional lift to fly high enough; moisture-sensitive; can spontaneously ignite; rarely used as primary fuel except in smoke compositions, can be encountered as a secondary enhancement fuel
  - Copper – used as a blue colorant with other fuels
  - Brass – a zinc-copper alloy used in some fireworks formulas, as a blue colorant for its copper content
  - Tungsten – used to control and slow down burn rates of compositions, also in delay compositions
  - Zirconium-nickel alloy – used in some military delay compositions
- Metal hydrides (lower heat of combustion than pure metals, but increased sensitivity/reactivity to water):
  - Titanium(II) hydride – together with potassium perchlorate it is used in some igniters
  - Zirconium(II) hydride – together with potassium perchlorate it is used in some igniters
  - Aluminum hydride – unstable for storage (decomposes easily with humidity) and reacts dangerously in contact with water
  - Decaborane – experimented with for some rocket fuels
- Metal carbides
  - Zirconium carbide – used in some rocket fuels, also a combustion instability suppressant
- Metalloids
  - Silicon – high flame temperature, burns producing molten glass, used in some ignition compositions and delay charges, commonly with lead tetroxide
  - Boron – used in some ignition mixtures
  - Antimony – used in some fireworks for glitter effects, toxic, burns bright white; usually used as 200–300 mesh; with potassium nitrate and sulfur produces white fires
- Non-metallic inorganic
  - Sulfur – ignition promoter, increases burn rate; increases sensitivity to temperature, impact and friction, dangerous in combination with chlorates; commonly used with nitrates; used as an additive; may contain residual acids, combination with carbonates or other alkaline stabilizers is advised in acid-sensitive compositions
  - Red phosphorus – extremely dangerous, especially in combination with chlorates (Armstrong's mixture); used in caps; also used in matches and some military infrared flares; toxic
  - White phosphorus – used in incendiary weapons and to make some military smoke screens, ignites spontaneously in air; even more toxic
  - Calcium silicide – used in some special compositions
  - Antimony trisulfide – ignition promoter; fine powder increases sensitivity, sharpens the boom of salutes; toxic and sensitive to static electricity; emits bright white light, crystals also used as a fuel in glitter compositions and in white comets and pyrotechnic stars. Sensitive to friction and impact; the degree of sensitisation depends on the oxidizer (sensitive to friction and impact with potassium chlorate, friction with potassium perchlorate, impact with ammonium perchlorate, and insensitive to either with potassium nitrate).
  - Arsenic sulfide (realgar) – toxic, sensitive to impact and friction. Used for report compositions due to its sensitivity with chlorate even in small amounts. Used in yellow smoke compositions due to its low boiling point.
  - Phosphorus trisulfide – used to make matches
  - Calcium phosphide – liberates phosphine when wet, used in some naval signal flares
  - Potassium thiocyanate
- Carbon-based
  - Carbon
    - Charcoal – makes dim gold sparks
    - Graphite – also used as opacifier in rocket fuels to prevent heat transfer by radiation into lower layers of fuels and avoid the related explosions
    - Carbon black – produces long lasting fine gold sparks in fireworks, also used as opacifier in rocket fuels
  - Asphaltum – carbon-based fuel, also used as a binder. Some forms contain ammonia; should not be combined with chlorates.
  - Wood flour
- Organic chemicals
  - Sodium benzoate – often used in whistle mixes together with potassium perchlorate
  - Sodium salicylate – used in some whistle mixes
  - Gallic acid – used in some whistle mixes; sensitive to impact and friction, there are safer alternatives
  - Potassium picrate – used in some whistle compositions, safer than gallic acid but still dangerous, with heavy metals (e.g. lead) forms explosive salts
  - Terephthalic acid – a fuel in some smoke compositions
  - Hexamine – a low-reactivity, accessory fuel
  - Anthracene – a fuel in some smoke compositions, produces black smoke
  - Naphthalene – a fuel in some smoke compositions
  - Lactose – used together with potassium chlorate in many smoke compositions; cheap low-reactivity accessory fuel
  - Dextrose – used in some amateur solid rocket fuels
  - Sucrose – used in some smoke compositions
  - Sorbitol – used together with potassium nitrate as an amateur solid rocket fuel
  - Dextrin – also a binder
  - Stearin, stearic acid – accessory fuel, a possible replacement for charcoal and/or sulfur in some compositions; lengthens flames, can reduce friction sensitivity; phlegmatizing agent
  - Hexachloroethane – used in many military smoke compositions
- Organic polymers and resins, also sometimes serving as binders
  - Teflon, Viton and other fluoropolymers – sometimes also working as oxidizer – used in military pyrolant compositions, e.g. Magnesium/Teflon/Viton; extremely reactive in contact with some fine metal powders
  - Hydroxyl-terminated polybutadiene (HTPB), used together with aluminium and ammonium nitrate in composite rocket fuels as a fuel and binder
  - Carboxyl-terminated polybutadiene (CTPB), used in composite rocket fuels as a fuel and binder
  - PBAN, used together with aluminium and ammonium nitrate in composite rocket fuels as a fuel and binder
  - Polysulfide, used in composite rocket fuels as a fuel and binder
  - Polyurethane, used in composite rocket fuels as a fuel and binder
  - Polyisobutylene
  - Nitrocellulose
  - Polyethylene
  - Polyvinyl chloride, also serving as chlorine donor and a binder
  - Polyvinylidene chloride, also serving as chlorine donor
  - Shellac, good especially for colored flame compositions
  - Accroides resin (red gum), higher burning rate than shellac, burns well even with potassium perchlorate. Suitable for chrysanthemum stars.

When metallic fuels are used, the metal particle size is important. A larger surface area to volume ratio leads to a faster reaction; this means that smaller particle sizes produce a faster-burning composition. The shape also matters. Spherical particles, like those produced by atomizing molten metal, are undesirable. Thin and flat particles, like those produced by milling metal foil, have higher reaction surface and therefore are ideal when faster reaction is desired. Using nanoparticles can drastically affect the reaction rates; metastable intermolecular composites exploit this.

A suitable metal fuel may be dangerous on its own, even before it is mixed with an oxidizer. Careful handling is required to avoid the production of pyrophoric metal powders.

=== Oxidizers ===
Perchlorates, chlorates and nitrates are the most commonly used oxidizers for flash powders. Other possibilities include permanganates, chromates, and some oxides. Generally, the less the oxidizer, the slower the burning and the more light produced. For use at very high temperatures, sulfates can be used as oxidizers in combination with very strongly reducing fuels.

Oxidizers in use include:

- Perchlorates (also serving as chlorine donors):
  - Potassium perchlorate – common, relatively stable. Almost non-hygroscopic. Low solubility in water. Produces high temperature flame and smoke of potassium chloride. Safer replacement of potassium chlorate. Impact-sensitive with phosphorus,
  - Ammonium perchlorate – the most common oxidizer for modern solid rocket fuels; more sensitive to mechanical stimuli than potassium perchlorate. Uncommon in fireworks; creates hot flame, enhances barium, strontium and copper colorants by acting as a chlorine donor. Reacts with magnesium when wet and liberates heat and ammonia, can self-ignite. In contact with potassium nitrate (e.g. in black powder) produces potassium perchlorate and hygroscopic ammonium nitrate; no such reaction with sodium nitrate. Reacts with potassium chlorate, producing unstable, gradually decomposing ammonium chlorate; such combination has to be avoided.
  - Nitronium perchlorate
- Chlorates (also serving as chlorine donors, incompatible with ammonium salts because of forming unstable explosive ammonium chlorate, incompatible with sulfur and other acidic chemicals because of production of spontaneously igniting chlorine dioxide; very dangerous with phosphorus; should not be combined with hydrocarbon fuels/binders, e.g. asphalt or gum arabic; should be replaced with safer perchlorates wherever possible):
  - Potassium chlorate – much less stable than perchlorate, hazardous, avoid if possible. High burning speed, easy ignition. Slightly more hygroscopic than potassium nitrate. Produces smoke of potassium chloride. Can act as a chlorine donor. High impact and friction sensitivity with sulfur and sulfides. With ammonium salts produces unstable ammonium chlorate. Used in match head compositions, some colored smokes, and small firecrackers and toy caps.
  - Barium chlorate – also serves as a green colorant in fireworks; sensitive, better to avoid. Almost non-hygroscopic. Compositions may spontaneously combust in sunlight. Very good green colorant, even in lower-temperature flames.
  - Sodium chlorate – much less stable than perchlorate, hazardous, also serves as yellow colorant, hygroscopic
- Nitrates (when mixing with aluminium, boric acid should be added as a stabilizer):
  - Potassium nitrate – very common, used in black powder and wide variety of compositions. Not very hygroscopic. At lower temperatures (with ordinary fuels like rosin or shellac) not very efficient, does not burn well, produces potassium nitrite. At higher temperatures, with charcoal and sulfur or with magnesium, decomposes well. Does not produce sufficient temperature to make colored flames, except when magnesium is added. Makes good sparks. Presence in dust makes the dust hazardous and very flammable.
  - Sodium nitrate – also a yellow colorant, hygroscopic. Gives intense yellow light, used for illumination compositions. Presence in dust makes the dust hazardous. At lower temperatures produces nitrite ash, at higher temperatures decomposes completely.
  - Calcium nitrate – also a red-orange colorant.
  - Ammonium nitrate – used in some less common composite rocket propellants, hygroscopic, decomposes at too low temperature; when dry reacts with Al, Zn, Pb, Sb, Bi, Ni, Cu, Ag, Cd; when wet reacts also with Fe. Forms an explosive compound with copper.
  - Barium nitrate – most common oxidizer/colorant for green and white colors, but with somewhat weak colorant effect;requires a chlorine donor. Also used in flash powders and some military infrared flares. Barium also serves as a stabilizer for the mixtures; decomposes at higher temperatures than nitrates of lighter metals and promotes higher burning temperatures. With aluminium produces bright silver sparks; when used with aluminium, addition of boric acid as stabilizer is advised. Not very hygroscopic.
  - Strontium nitrate – most common oxidizer/colorant for red colors in flares, fires, and stars; strontium also serves as a stabilizer for the mixtures. At lower temperatures (with organic fuels) produces strontium nitrite ash which can smother the flame; decomposes completely at higher temperatures (with magnesium). Colorant for low-temperature flames, colorant and oxidizer for hot flames.
  - Caesium nitrate – used in some military infrared flare compositions
- Permanganates:
  - Potassium permanganate – used in early mixtures, now considered to be sensitive and unstable
  - Ammonium permanganate – a moderately powerful explosive
- Chromates:
  - Barium chromate – used in delay compositions, e.g. in fireworks rockets
  - Lead chromate – used in delay compositions
  - Potassium dichromate – used infrequently as an oxidizer; can be used as a surface treatment for passivation of magnesium particles, also as a catalyst and in some matches; potassium perchlorate often added
- Oxides and peroxides:
  - Barium peroxide – unstable, spontaneously decomposes, compositions containing it should not be stored
  - Strontium peroxide
  - Lead tetroxide – versatile but toxic
  - Lead dioxide – used in friction-sensitive compositions, e.g. matches
  - Bismuth trioxide – used as a safe alternative to lead tetroxide in some compositions
  - Iron(III) oxide – a high temperature oxidizer, a catalyst
  - Iron(II,III) oxide – an oxidizer in Thermite and Thermate
  - Manganese(IV) oxide – an oxidizer in manganese thermite, a catalyst
  - Chromium(III) oxide – an oxidizer in chromium thermite
  - Tin(IV) oxide – an oxidizer in some delay charges
- Sulfates (reactions require high temperatures and strongly reducing fuels):
  - Barium sulfate – a high-temperature oxidizer for e.g. strobe compositions, a green colorant
  - Calcium sulfate – a high-temperature oxidizer for e.g. strobe compositions, a red-orange colorant.
  - Potassium sulfate – a high-temperature oxidizer, a purple colorant
  - Sodium sulfate – a high-temperature oxidizer, a yellow colorant
  - Strontium sulfate – a high-temperature oxidizer, a red colorant
- Organic chemicals
  - Guanidine nitrate – used in some high power rocket fuels, propellants, and blue firework compositions
  - Hexanitroethane – used in some special military compositions
  - Cyclotrimethylene trinitramine – used in some double-base propellants
  - Cyclotetramethylene Tetranitramine – used in some double-base propellants
- Others
  - Sulfur – oxidizer for zinc in zinc-sulfur fuels
  - Teflon – oxidizer for some metal fuels
  - Boron – oxidizer for titanium, forming titanium diboride

Corresponding sodium salts can be substituted for potassium ones.

=== Additives ===
- Coolants. For some purposes it is necessary to lower the burning temperature of the mixture, and/or slow down the reaction rate. For such purpose, inert materials (e.g. clay, diatomaceous earth, alumina, silica, magnesium oxide, or others) or endothermically decomposing materials (e.g. carbonates) are added. Oxamide is used as a high performance burning rate suppressant in some propellant compositions. Strontium carbonate is used as a fire retardant in some gunpowders.
- Flame suppressants. Potassium nitrate and potassium sulfate are commonly used.
- Opacifiers. Some solid rocket propellants have problems with radiative heat transfer through the material, which may lead to explosion. Carbon black and graphite are often used to inhibit this effect.
- Colorants, sometimes in combination with sources of chlorine. Usually salts of suitable metals, often barium, strontium, calcium, sodium, copper, etc. The salt may simultaneously serve as an oxidizer. Copper metal can be also used. Copper acetoarsenite with potassium perchlorate provides richest blue.
- Chlorine donors. Used together with colorants. In some cases, the color emitting species is molecular and not atomic. Such is the case for blue pyrotechnic flames where the emitting species is copper monochloride. Also, some chloride molecular emitters are much stronger than oxides of the same element, as in the case of Barium and Strontium. Polyvinyl chloride, polyvinylidene chloride, Saran, chlorinated paraffins, chlorinated rubber (e.g. Parlon), hexachloroethane, hexachlorobenzene (most common chlorine donor until the 1970s, now rarely used), and some other organochlorides and inorganic chlorides (e.g. ammonium chloride, mercurous chloride) are used as chlorine donors. Perchlorates and chlorates play this role together with their main use as oxidizers. Chlorine donors are often used also in smoke compositions, e.g. hexachloroethane together with zinc oxide to produce smoke based on zinc chloride.
- Catalysts. Propellant formulas often require a catalyst to burn faster and more stably. Transition metal ions and complexes tend to be used. Certain oxidizers often serve as catalysts. E.g. ammonium dichromate is used as a catalyst in ammonium nitrate based propellant formulas. Other catalysts are e.g. iron(III) oxide, hydrated ferric oxide, manganese dioxide, potassium dichromate, copper chromite, lead salicylate, lead stearate, lead 2-ethylhexoate, copper salicylate, copper stearate, lithium fluoride, n-butyl ferrocene, di-n-butyl ferrocene.
- Stabilizers. Some mixtures, e.g. containing chlorates, tend to degrade and create acidic byproducts. Carbonates (e.g. sodium, calcium, or barium carbonate) or other mildly alkaline materials can be added to scavenge such acids. Boric acid can be used to inhibit the sensitivity of aluminium to moisture, and to stabilize mixtures of metals with nitrates (which can otherwise form amides which react exothermically with metals and can cause spontaneous initiation). Many organic nitrated amines are used as stabilizers as well, e.g. 2-nitrodiphenylamine. Petroleum jelly, castor oil, linseed oil, etc. can be used as stabilizers, also to add hydrophobicity to particles and protect metals (especially iron and magnesium) from corrosion. Ethyl centralite and 2-nitrodiphenylamine are used in some rocket propellants.
- Anticaking agents. E.g. fumed silica. For powder compositions, e.g. flash powder or gunpowder. Graphite is used in some cases to coat the grains, lubricate them, and dissipate static electricity. Magnesium carbonate used too, together with its function as carbonate stabilizer.
- Binders. Often gums and resins, e.g. gum arabic, red gum, guar gum, copal, carboxymethyl cellulose, nitrocellulose, rice starch, cornstarch, shellac, dextrin. Binders can also serve as fuels. Camphor can be used as a plasticizer. Binders are used in manufacture of compact compositions, e.g. pyrotechnic stars. Polymers like HTPB and PBAN are often used for rocket fuels. Other polymers used are e.g. polyethylene or polyvinyl chloride can be encountered as well.
- Plasticizers. Improve the mechanical properties of the propellant particles. For composite rocket propellants, dioctyl adipate, isodecyl pelargonate, and dioctyl phthalate are often used. Plasticizers can also be other energetic materials (common in smokeless powders), e.g. nitroglycerine, butanetriol trinitrate, dinitrotoluene, trimethylolethane trinitrate, diethylene glycol dinitrate, triethylene glycol dinitrate, bis(2,2-dinitropropyl)formal, bis(2,2-dinitropropyl)acetal, 2,2,2-trinitroethyl 2-nitroxyethyl ether, and others.
- Curing and crosslinking agents. Used to harden the polymer component of composite rocket propellants. They include paraquinone dioxime, toluene-2,4-diisocyanate, tris(1-(2-methyl) aziridinyl) phosphine oxide, N,N,O-tri(1,2-epoxy propyl)-4-aminophenol, and isophorone diisocyanate.
- Bonding agents. Used to increase the level of bonding between the binder and the fuel/oxidizer particles. They include tris(1-(2-methyl) azirinidyl) phosphine oxide and triethanolamine.

== See also ==
- Thermite
- Nano-thermite
- Thermate
