= Nano-thermite =

Fine-particled pyrotechnic composition

Nano-thermite or super-thermite is a metastable intermolecular composite (MIC) characterized by a particle size of its main constituents, a metal fuel and oxidizer, under 100 nanometers. This allows for high and customizable reaction rates. Nano-thermites contain an oxidizer and a reducing agent, which are intimately mixed on the nanometer scale. MICs, including nano-thermitic materials, are a type of reactive materials investigated for military use, as well as for general applications involving propellants, explosives, and pyrotechnics.

What distinguishes MICs from traditional thermites is that the oxidizer and a reducing agent, normally iron oxide and aluminium, are in the form of extremely fine powders (nanoparticles). This dramatically increases the reactivity relative to micrometre-sized powder thermite. As the mass transport mechanisms that slow down the burning rates of traditional thermites are not so important at these scales, the reaction proceeds much more quickly.

== Potential uses ==
Historically, pyrotechnic or explosive applications for traditional thermites have been limited due to their relatively slow energy release rates. Because nanothermites are created from reactant particles with proximities approaching the atomic scale, energy release rates are far greater.

MICs or super-thermites are generally developed for military use, propellants, explosives, incendiary devices and pyrotechnics. Research into military applications of nano-sized materials began in the early 1990s. Because of their highly increased reaction rate, nano-thermitic materials are being studied by the U.S. military with the aim of developing new types of bombs several times more powerful than conventional explosives. Nanoenergetic materials can store more energy than conventional energetic materials and can be used in innovative ways to tailor the release of this energy. Thermobaric weapons are one potential application of nanoenergetic materials.

== Types ==
There are many possible thermodynamically stable fuel-oxidizer combinations. Some of them are:

- Aluminium-molybdenum(VI) oxide
- Aluminium-copper(II) oxide
- Aluminium-iron(II,III) oxide
- Antimony-potassium permanganate
- Aluminium-potassium permanganate
- Aluminium-bismuth(III) oxide
- Aluminium-tungsten(VI) oxide hydrate
- Aluminium-fluoropolymer (typically Viton)
- Titanium-boron (burns to titanium diboride, which belongs to a class of compounds called intermetallic composites).

In military research, aluminium-molybdenum oxide, aluminium-Teflon and aluminium-copper(II) oxide have received considerable attention. Other compositions tested were based on nanosized RDX and with thermoplastic elastomers. PTFE or other fluoropolymer can be used as a binder for the composition. Its reaction with the aluminium, similar to magnesium/teflon/viton thermite, adds energy to the reaction. Of the listed compositions, that with potassium permanganate has the highest pressurization rate.

The most common method of preparing nanoenergetic materials is by ultrasonification in quantities of less than 2g. Some research has been developed to increase production scales. Due to the very high electrostatic discharge (ESD) sensitivity of these materials, sub 1 gram scales are currently typical.

== Production ==
Nanoaluminium, or ultra fine grain (UFG) aluminium, powders are a key component of most nano-thermitic materials. A method for producing this material is the dynamic gas-phase condensation method, pioneered by Wayne Danen and Steve Son at Los Alamos National Laboratory. A variant of the method is being used at the Indian Head Division of the Naval Surface Warfare Center. Another method for production is electrothermal synthesis, developed by NovaCentrix, which uses a pulsed plasma arc to vaporize the aluminum. The powders made by the dynamic gas-phase condensation and the electrothermal synthesis processes are indistinguishable. A critical aspect of the production is the ability to produce particles of sizes in the tens of nano-meter range, as well as with a limited distribution of particle sizes. In 2002, the production of nano-sized aluminum particles required considerable effort, and commercial sources for the material were limited.

An application of the sol-gel method, developed by Randall Simpson, Alexander Gash and others at the Lawrence Livermore National Laboratory, can be used to make the actual mixtures of nano-structured composite energetic materials. Depending on the process, MICs of different density can be produced. Highly porous and uniform products can be achieved by super-critical extraction.

The most common types of production are in liquids or via resonant acoustic mixing. However, more complicated methods like the ones previously mentioned are used.

== Ignition ==
As with all explosives, research into control yet simplicity has been a goal of research into nanoscale explosives. Some can be ignited with laser pulses.

MICs have been investigated as a possible replacement for lead (e.g. lead styphnate, lead azide) in percussion caps and electric matches. Compositions based on Al-Bi_{2}O_{3} tend to be used. PETN may be optionally added.

Aluminium powder can be added to nano explosives. Aluminium has a relatively low combustion rate and a high enthalpy of combustion.

The products of a thermite reaction, resulting from ignition of the nano-thermitic mixture, are usually metal oxides and elemental metals. At the temperatures prevailing during the reaction, the products can be solid, liquid or gaseous, depending on the components of the mixture.

== Hazards ==
Like conventional thermite, super thermite reacts at very high temperature and is difficult to extinguish. The reaction produces dangerous ultra-violet (UV) light, requiring that the reaction not be viewed directly or that special eye protection (for example, a welder's mask) be worn.

In addition, super thermites are very sensitive to electrostatic discharge (ESD). Surrounding the metal oxide particles with carbon nanofibers may make nanothermites safer to handle.

== See also ==
- Thermate
- Pyrotechnic composition
