= Thermate =

Incendiary pyrotechnic composition

Thermate is a variation of thermite and is an incendiary pyrotechnic composition that can generate short bursts of very high temperatures focused on a small area for a short period of time. It is used primarily in incendiary grenades.

The main chemical reaction in thermate is the same as in thermite: an aluminothermic reaction between powdered aluminium and a metal oxide. Thermate can also utilize magnesium or other similar elements in place of aluminium. In addition to thermite, thermate sometimes contains sulfur and sometimes barium nitrate, both of which increase its thermal effect, create flame in burning, and significantly reduce the ignition temperature. Various mixtures of these compounds can be called thermate, but to avoid confusion with thermate-TH3, one can refer to them as thermite variants or analogs. The composition by weight of Thermate-TH3 (in military use) is 68.7% thermite, 29.0% barium nitrate, 2.0% sulfur and 0.3% binder (such as polybutadiene acrylonitrile (PBAN)). As both thermite and thermate are notoriously difficult to ignite, initiating the reaction normally requires supervision and sometimes persistent effort.

Because thermate burns at higher temperatures than ordinary thermite, it has military applications in cutting through tank armor or other hardened military vehicles or bunkers. As with thermite, thermate's ability to burn without an external supply of oxygen makes it useful for underwater incendiary devices.

== See also ==
- Nano-thermite
