= Smoke screen =

Airborne obscurant using gas and particulates

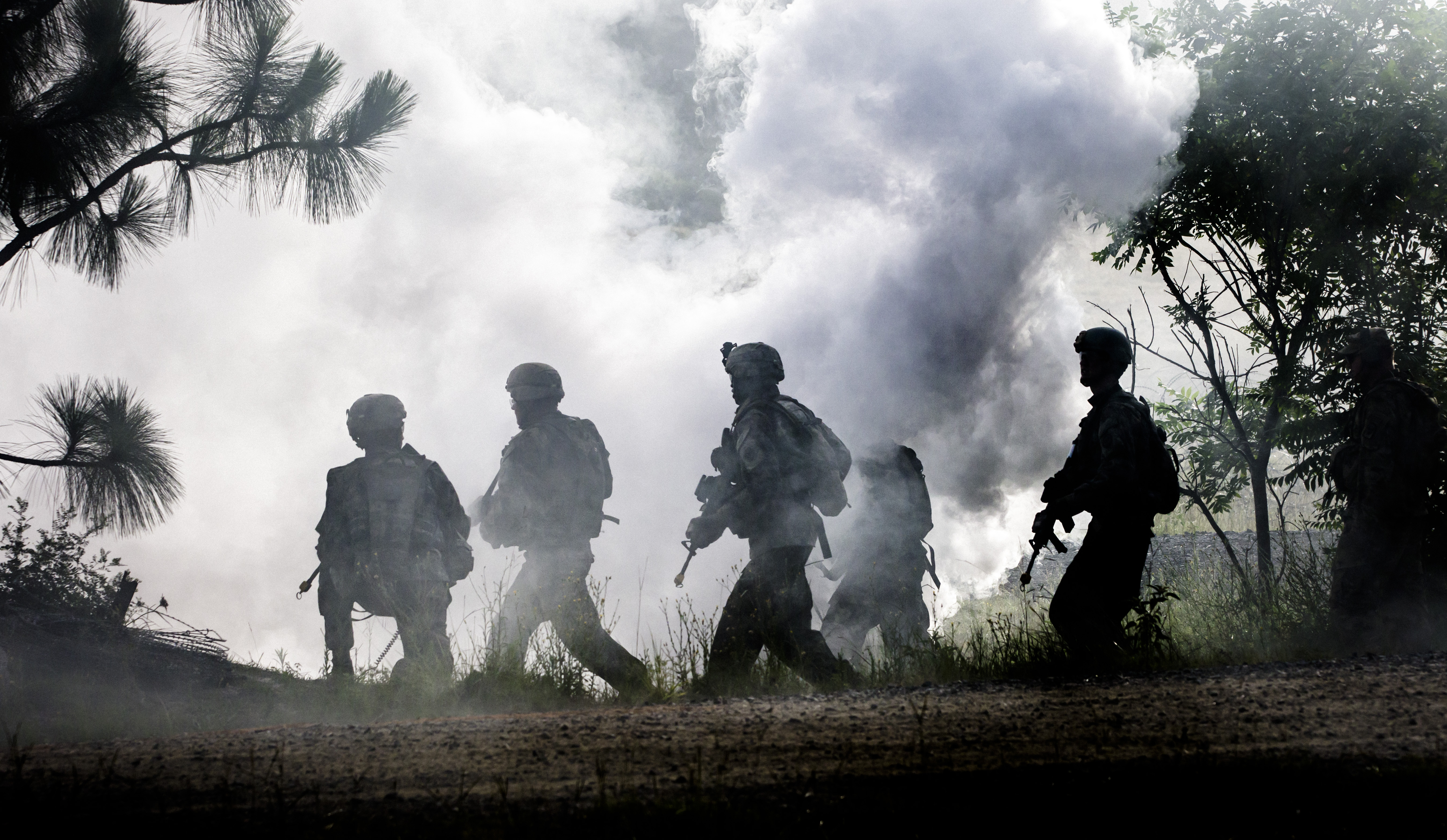
Soldiers advancing under the cover of a smoke screen during a training exercise

A smoke screen is smoke released to mask the movement or location of military units such as infantry, tanks, aircraft, or ships.

Smoke screens are commonly deployed either by a canister (such as a grenade) or generated by a vehicle (such as a tank or a warship).

Whereas smoke screens were originally used to hide movement from enemies' line of sight, modern technology means that they are now also available in new forms; they can screen in the infrared as well as visible spectrum of light to prevent detection by infrared sensors or viewers, and they are also available for vehicles in a super-dense form used to block laser beams of enemy laser designators or rangefinders.

== Technology ==
=== Smoke grenades ===
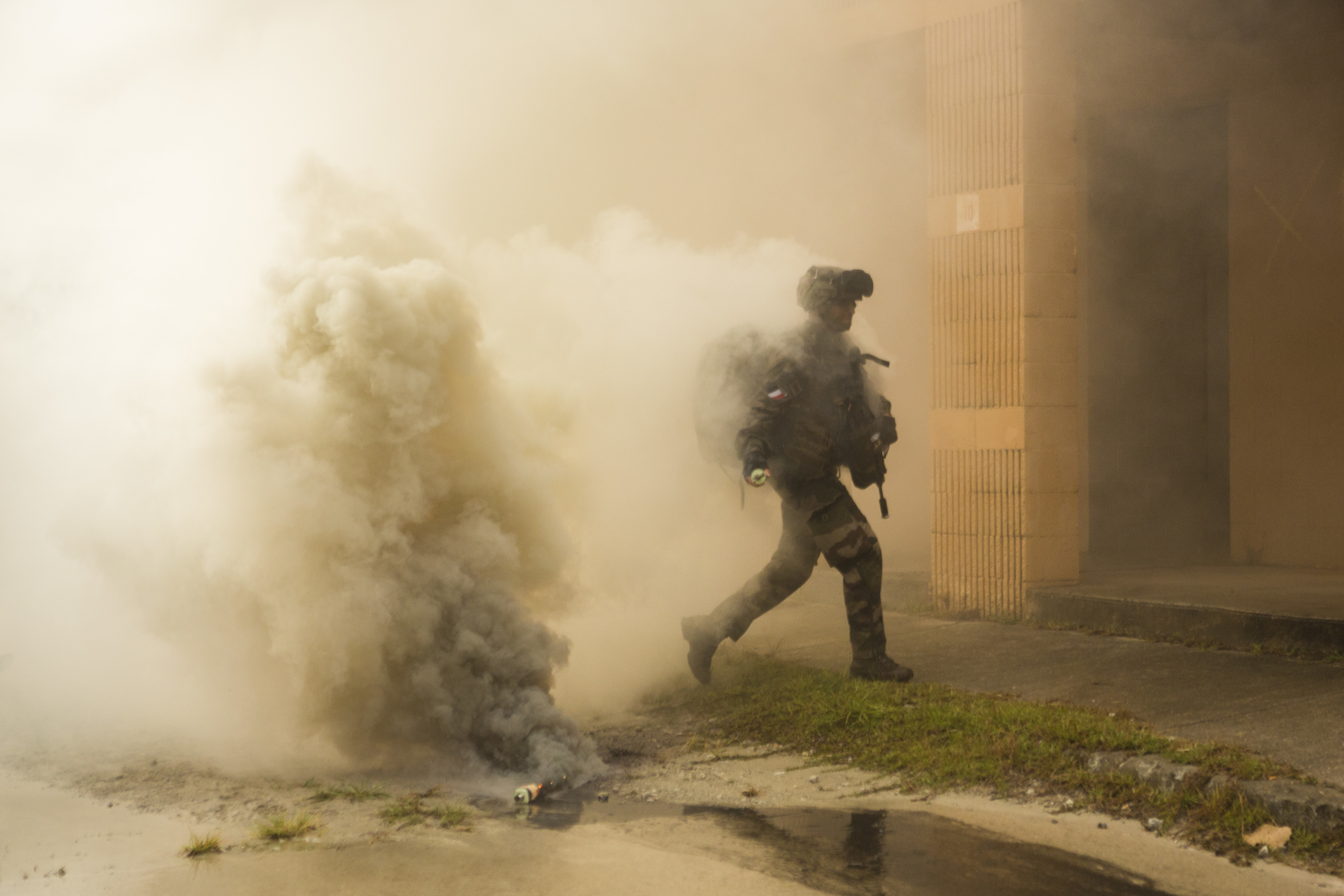
A French Legionnaire moving through a smoke screen generated using a smoke grenade

These are canister-type grenades used as a ground-to-ground or ground-to-air signalling device. The body consists of a steel sheet metal cylinder with a few emission holes on the top and/or bottom to allow smoke release when the smoke composition inside the grenade is ignited. In those that produce colored smoke, the filler consists of 250 to 350 grams of colored (red, green, yellow or violet) smoke mixture (mostly potassium chlorate, sodium bicarbonate, lactose and a dye). In those that produce screening smoke, the filler usually consists of HC smoke mixture (hexachloroethane/zinc) or TA smoke mixture (terephthalic acid). Another type of smoke grenade is filled with white phosphorus (WP), which is spread by explosive action. The phosphorus catches fire in the presence of air, and burns with a brilliant yellow flame, while producing copious amounts of white smoke (phosphorus pentoxide). WP grenades double as incendiary grenades.

=== Smoke shell ===
Artillery and mortars can also fire smoke generating munitions, and are the main means of generating tactical smokescreens on land. As with grenades, artillery shells are available as both emission type smoke shell, and bursting smoke shell. Mortars nearly always use bursting smoke rounds because of the smaller size of mortar bombs and the greater efficiency of bursting rounds.

=== Smoke generators ===
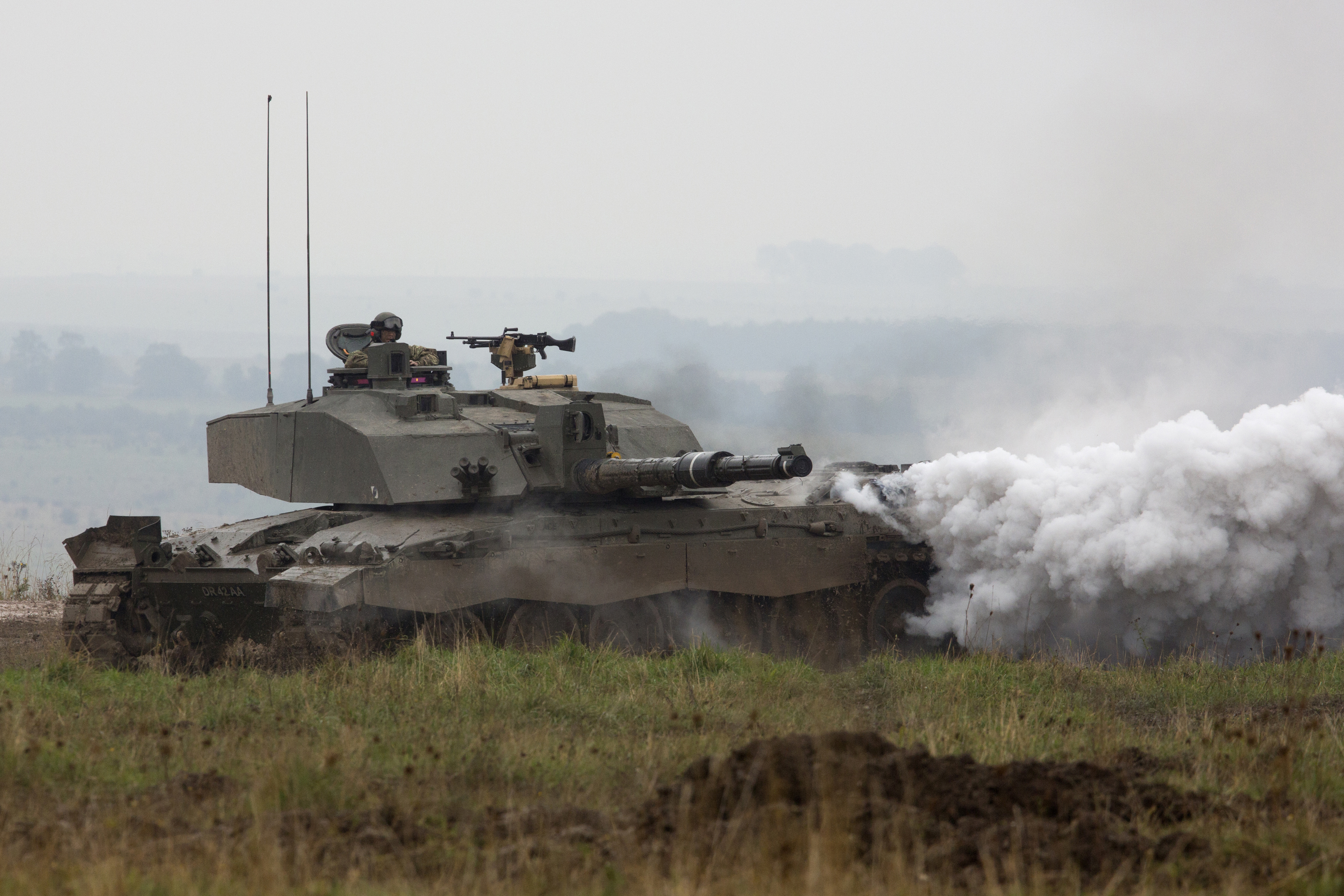
A British Army Challenger 2 deploying a smoke screen using a smoke generator installed in its rear

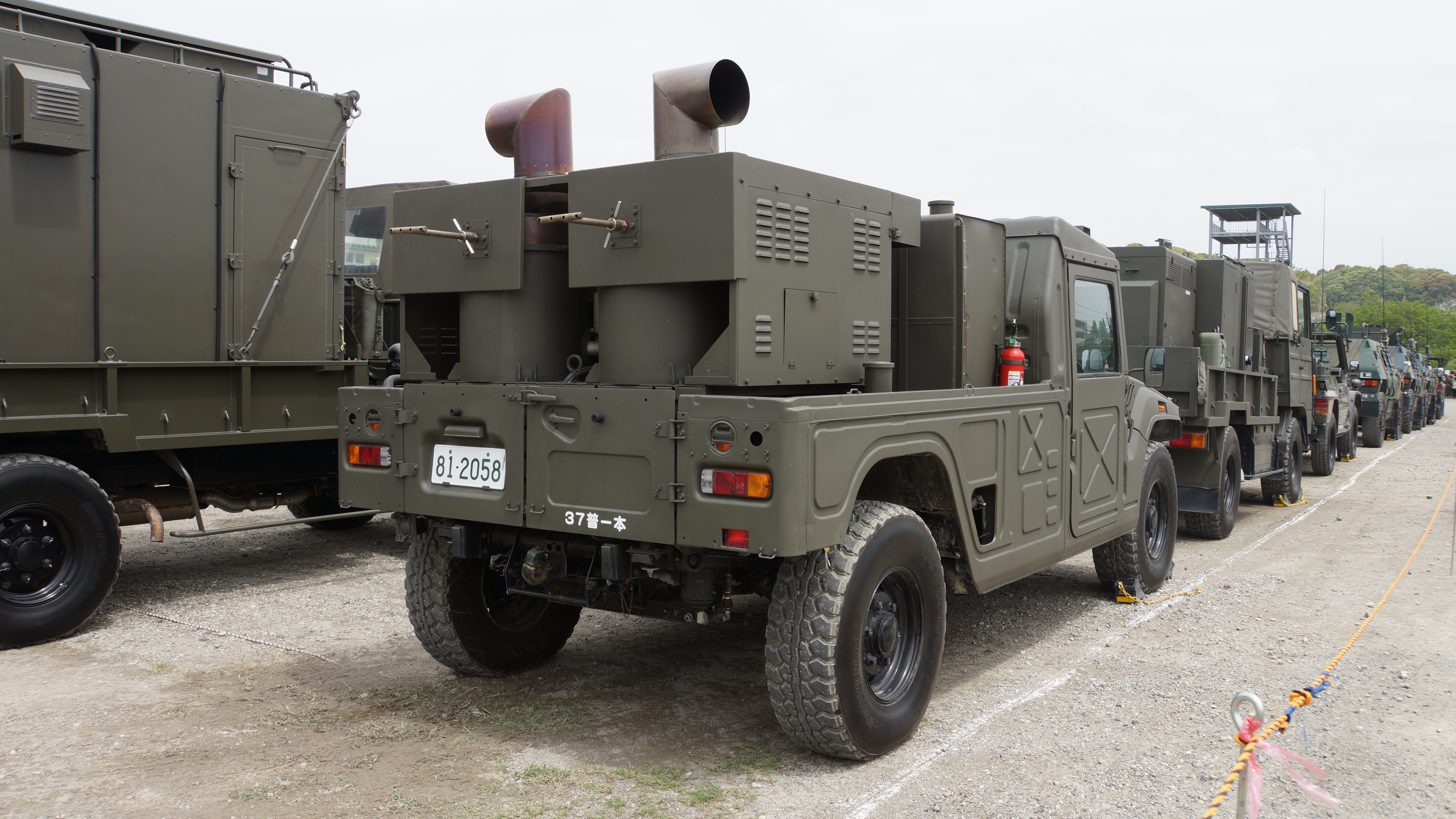
A JGSDF Toyota Mega Cruiser with a smoke generator installed in its rear compartment

Very large or sustained smoke screens are produced by a smoke generator. This machine heats a volatile material (typically oil or an oil based mixture) to evaporate it, then mixes the vapor with cool external air at a controlled rate so it condenses to a mist with a controlled droplet size. Cruder designs simply boiled waste oil over a heater, while more sophisticated ones sprayed a specially formulated oily composition ("fog oil") through nozzles onto a heated plate. Choice of a suitable oil, and careful control of cooling rate, can produce droplet sizes close to the ideal size for Mie scattering of visible light. This produces a very effective obscuration per weight of material used. This screen can then be sustained as long as the generator is supplied with oil, and—especially if a number of generators are used—the screen can build up to a considerable size. One 50 gallon drum of fog oil can obscure 60 miles (97 km) of land in 15 minutes.

Whilst producing very large amounts of smoke relatively cheaply, these generators have a number of disadvantages. They are much slower to respond than pyrotechnic sources, and require a valuable piece of equipment to be sited at the point of emission of the smoke. They are also relatively heavy and not readily portable, which is a significant problem if the wind shifts. To overcome this latter problem, they may be used in fixed posts widely dispersed over the battlefield, or else mounted on specially adapted vehicles. An example of the latter is the M56 Coyote generator.

Many armoured fighting vehicles can create smoke screens in a similar way, generally by injecting diesel fuel onto the hot exhaust.

=== Naval methods ===
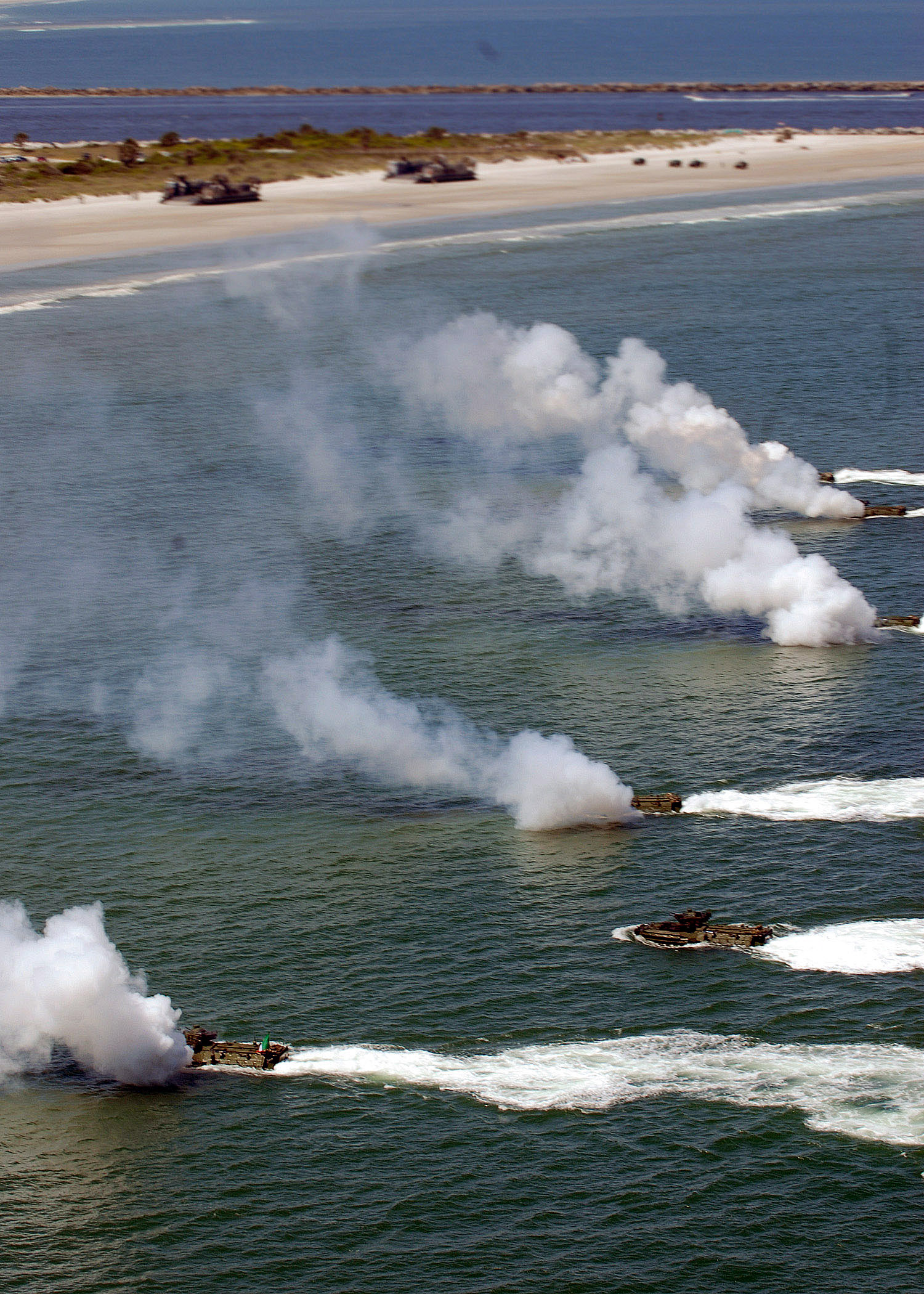
Assault Amphibious Vehicles deploying smoke to cover their landing

Warships have sometimes used a simple variation of the smoke generator, by injecting fuel oil directly into the funnel, where it evaporates into a white cloud. An even simpler method that was used in the days of steam-propelled warships was to restrict the supply of air to the boiler. This resulted in incomplete combustion of the coal or oil, which produced a thick black smoke. Because the smoke was black, it absorbed heat from the sun and tended to rise above the water. Therefore, navies turned to various chemicals, such as titanium tetrachloride, that produce a white, low-lying cloud.

== Infrared smokes ==
The proliferation of thermal imaging FLIR systems on the battlefields necessitates the use of obscurant smokes that are effectively opaque in the infrared part of electromagnetic spectrum. This kind of obscurant smoke is sometimes referred to as "Visual and Infrared Screening Smoke" (VIRSS). To achieve this, the particle size and composition of the smokes has to be adjusted. One of the approaches is using an aerosol of burning red phosphorus particles and aluminium-coated glass fibers; the infrared emissions of such smoke curtains hides the weaker emissions of colder objects behind it, but the effect is only short-lived. Carbon (most often graphite) particles present in the smokes can also serve to absorb the beams of laser designators. Yet another possibility is a water fog sprayed around the vehicle; the presence of large droplets absorbs in infrared band and additionally serves as a countermeasure against radars in 94 GHz band. Other materials used as visible/infrared obscurants are micro-pulverized flakes of brass or graphite, particles of titanium dioxide, or terephthalic acid.

Older systems for production of infrared smoke work as generators of aerosol of dust with controlled particle size. Most contemporary vehicle-mounted systems use this approach. However, the aerosol stays airborne only for a short time.

The brass particles used in some infrared smoke grenades are typically composed of 70% copper and 30% zinc. They are shaped as irregular flakes with a diameter of about 1.7 μm and thickness of 80–320 nm.

Some experimental obscurants work in both infrared and millimeter wave region. They include carbon fibers, metal coated fibers or glass particles, metal microwires, particles of iron and of suitable polymers.

== Chemicals used ==
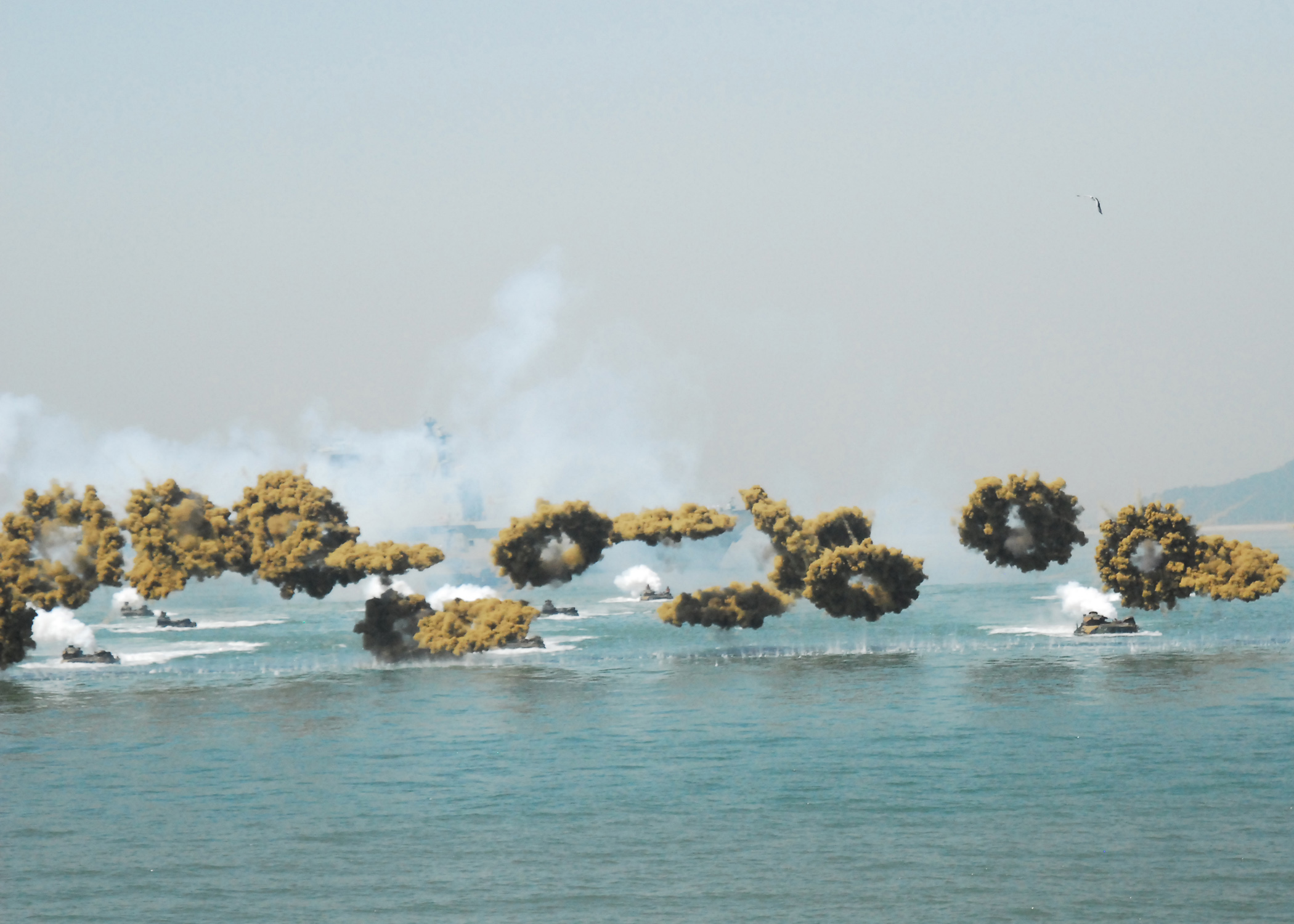
Amphibious vehicles deploying smoke grenades

=== Zinc chloride ===
Zinc chloride smoke is grey-white and consists of tiny particles of zinc chloride. The most common mixture for generating these is a zinc chloride smoke mixture (HC), consisting of hexachloroethane, grained aluminium and zinc oxide. The smoke consists of zinc chloride, zinc oxychlorides, and hydrochloric acid, which absorb the moisture in the air. The smoke also contains traces of organic chlorinated compounds, phosgene, carbon monoxide, and chlorine.

Its toxicity is caused mainly by the content of strongly acidic hydrochloric acid, but also due to thermal effects of reaction of zinc chloride with water. These effects cause lesions of the mucous membranes of the upper airways. Damage of the lower airways can manifest itself later as well, due to fine particles of zinc chloride and traces of phosgene. In high concentrations the smoke can be very dangerous when inhaled. Symptoms include dyspnea, retrosternal pain, hoarseness, stridor, lachrymation, cough, expectoration, and in some cases haemoptysis. Delayed pulmonary edema, cyanosis or bronchopneumonia may develop. The smoke and the spent canisters contain suspected carcinogens.

The prognosis for the casualties depends on the degree of the pulmonary damage. All exposed individuals should be kept under observation for 8 hours. Most affected individuals recover within several days, with some symptoms persisting for up to 1–2 weeks. Severe cases can suffer of reduced pulmonary function for some months, the worst cases developing marked dyspnoea and cyanosis leading to death.

Respirators are required for people coming into contact with the zinc chloride smoke.

=== Chlorosulfuric acid ===
Chlorosulfuric acid (CSA) is a heavy, strongly acidic liquid. When dispensed in air, it readily absorbs moisture and forms dense white fog of hydrochloric acid and sulfuric acid. In moderate concentrations it is highly irritating to eyes, nose, and skin.

When chlorosulfuric acid comes in contact with water, a strong exothermic reaction scatters the corrosive mixture in all directions. CSA is highly corrosive, so careful handling is required.

Low concentrations cause prickling sensations on the skin, but high concentrations or prolonged exposure to field concentrations can cause severe irritation of the eyes, skin, and respiratory tract, and mild cough and moderate contact dermatitis can result. Liquid CSA causes acid burns of skin and exposure of eyes can lead to severe eye damage.

Affected body parts should be washed with water and then with sodium bicarbonate solution. The burns are then treated like thermal burns. The skin burns heal readily, while cornea burns can result in residual scarring.

Respirators are required for any concentrations sufficient to cause any coughing, irritation of the eyes or prickling of the skin.

=== Titanium tetrachloride ===
Titanium tetrachloride (FM) is a colorless, non-flammable, corrosive liquid. In contact with damp air it hydrolyzes readily, resulting in a dense white smoke consisting of droplets of hydrochloric acid and particles of titanium oxychloride.

The titanium tetrachloride smoke is an irritant and unpleasant to breathe.

It is dispensed from aircraft to create vertical smoke curtains, and during World War II it was a favorite smoke generation agent on warships.

Goggles and a respirator should be worn when in contact with the smoke, full protective clothing should be worn when handling liquid FM. In direct contact with skin or eyes, liquid FM causes acid burns.

=== Phosphorus ===
Red phosphorus and white phosphorus (WP) are red or waxy yellow or white substances. White phosphorus is pyrophoric - can be handled safely when under water, but in contact with air it spontaneously ignites. It is used as an incendiary. Both types of phosphorus are used for smoke generation, mostly in artillery shells, bombs, and grenades.

White phosphorus smoke is typically very hot and may cause burns on contact. Red phosphorus is less reactive, does not ignite spontaneously, and its smoke does not cause thermal burns - for this reason it is safer to handle, but cannot be used so easily as an incendiary.

Aerosol of burning phosphorus particles is an effective obscurant against thermal imaging systems. However, this effect is short-lived. After the phosphorus particles fully burn, the smoke reverts from emission to absorption. While very effective in the visible spectrum, cool phosphorus smoke has only low absorption and scattering in infrared wavelengths. Additives in the smoke that involve this part of the spectrum may be visible to thermal imagers or IR viewers.

=== Dyes ===
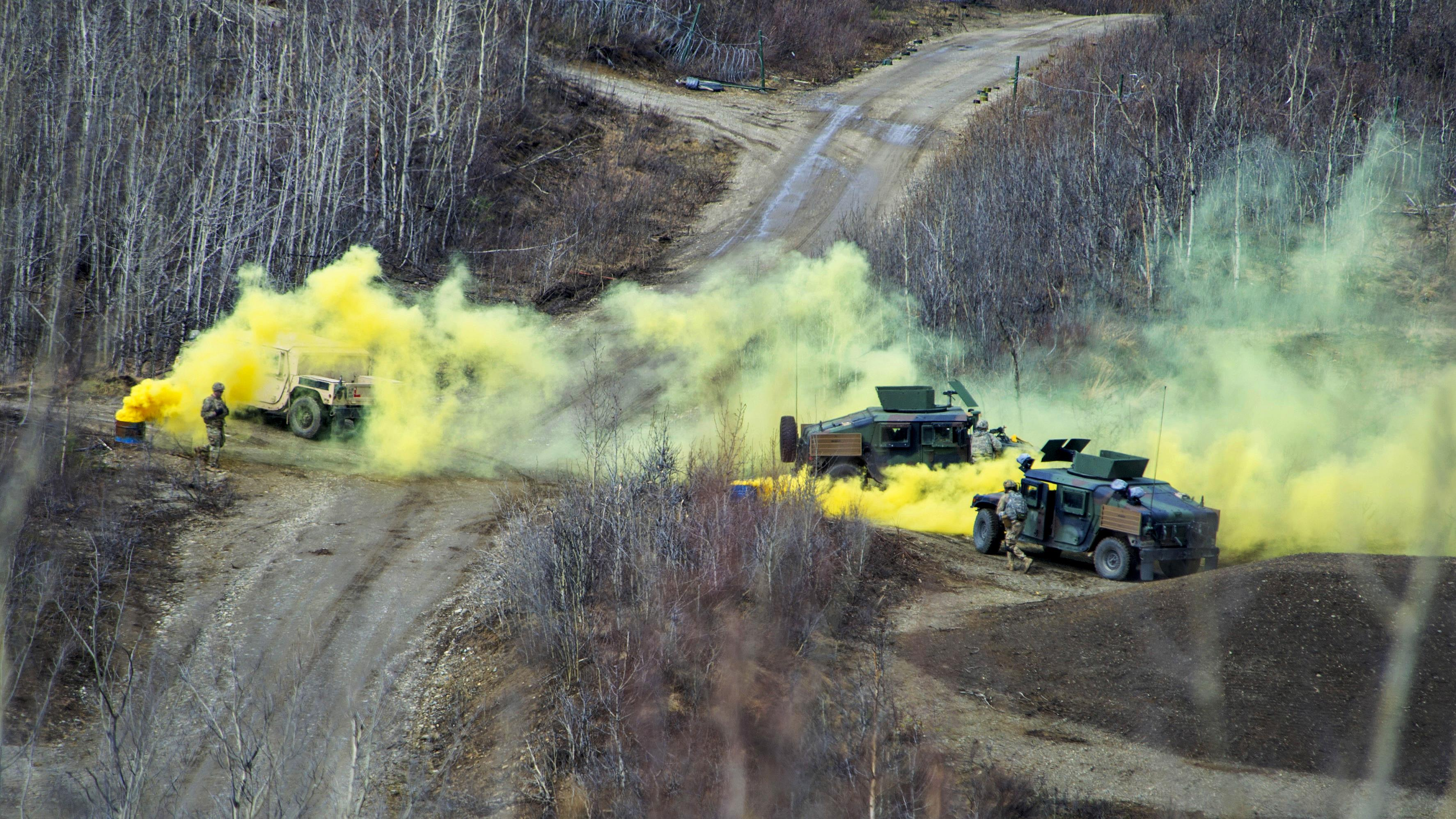
Yellow smoke screens deployed to mark soldiers completing an objective during Exercise Northern Edge 2017

Various signalling purposes require the use of colored smoke. The smoke created is a fine mist of dye particles, generated by burning a mixture of one or more dyes with a low-temperature pyrotechnic composition, usually based on potassium chlorate and lactose (also known as milk sugar).

Colored smoke screen is also possible by adding a colored dye into the fog oil mixture. Typical white smoke screen uses titanium dioxide (or other white pigment), but other colors are possible by replacing titanium dioxide with another pigment. When the hot fog oil condenses on contact with air, the pigment particles are suspended along with the oil vapor. Early smoke screen experiments attempted the use of colored pigment, but found that titanium dioxide was the most light scattering particle known and therefore best for use in obscuring troops and naval vessels. Colored smoke became primarily used for signaling rather than obscuring. In today's military, smoke grenades are found to be non-cancer causing, unlike the 1950s AN-M8 model.

=== Sulfonic acid ===
The smoke generator on the Medium Mark B tank used sulfonic acid.

== Tactics ==
=== History ===
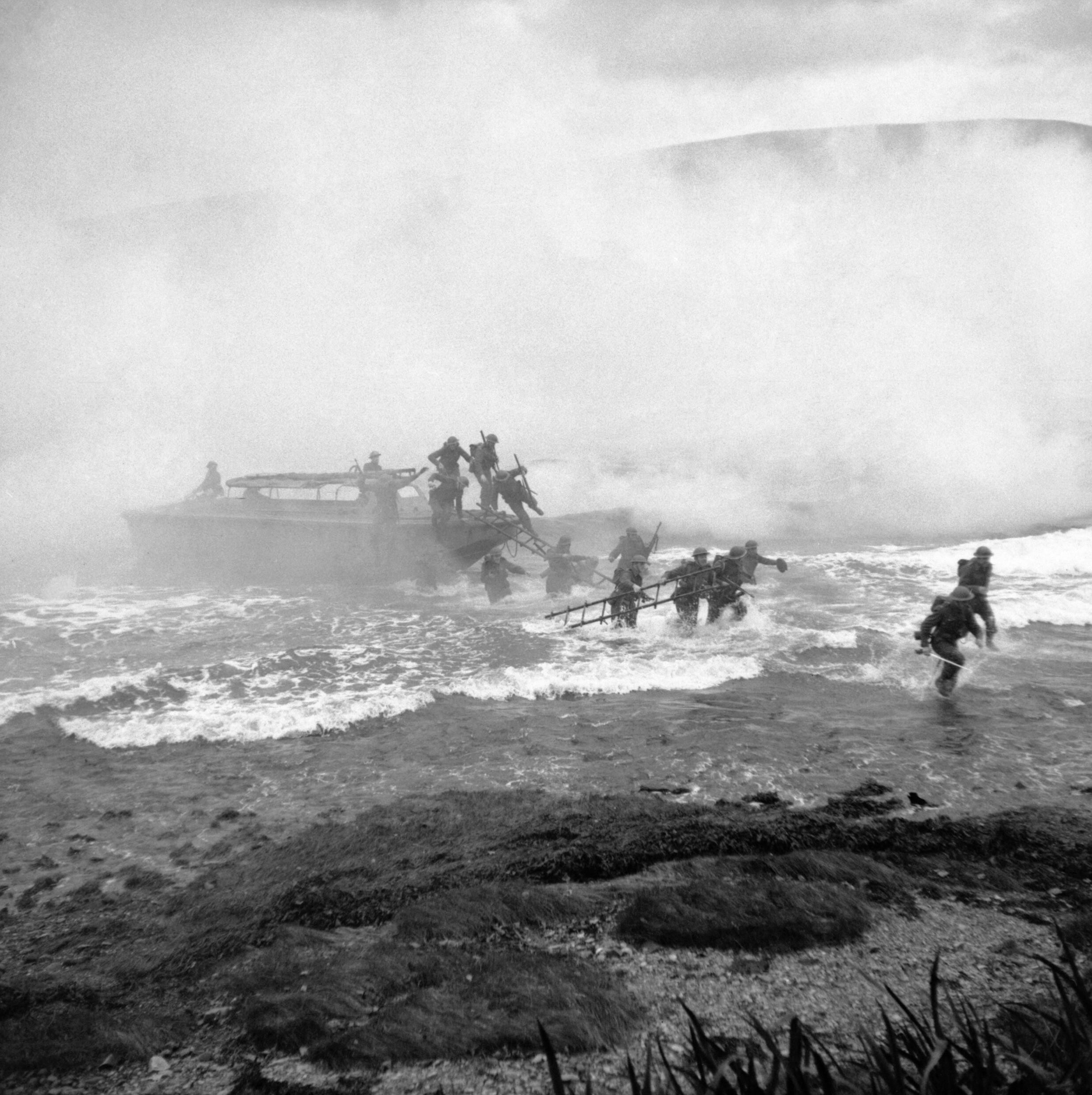
British and Scottish soldiers disembarking from a landing craft under a smoke screen, 1941

The first documented use of a smoke screen was circa 2000 B.C. in the wars of ancient India, where incendiary devices and toxic fumes caused people to fall asleep.

It was later recorded by a Greek historian, Thucydides, who described that the smoke created by the burning of sulphur, wood and pitch was carried by the wind into Plataea (428 B.C.) and later at Delium (423 B.C.) and that at Delium, defenders were driven from the city walls.

In 1622, a smoke screen was used at the Battle of Macau by the Dutch. A barrel of damp gunpowder was fired into the wind so that the Dutch could land under the cover of smoke.

Later, between 1790 and 1810, Thomas Cochrane, 10th Earl of Dundonald (1775–1860), a Scottish Naval commander and officer in the Royal Navy who fought during the French Revolutionary and Napoleonic Wars, devised a smoke screen created through the burning of sulphur which would be used in warfare after learning about the same methods used at Delium and Plataea.

Thomas Cochrane, 10th Earl of Dundonald's grandson, Douglas Cochrane, 12th Earl of Dundonald, described in his autobiography how he spoke to Winston Churchill (who once galloped for him when he had a brigade at manœuvres in England) of the importance of using smoke-screens on the battleground, it would in turn be used in both WWI & WW2.

=== Land warfare ===
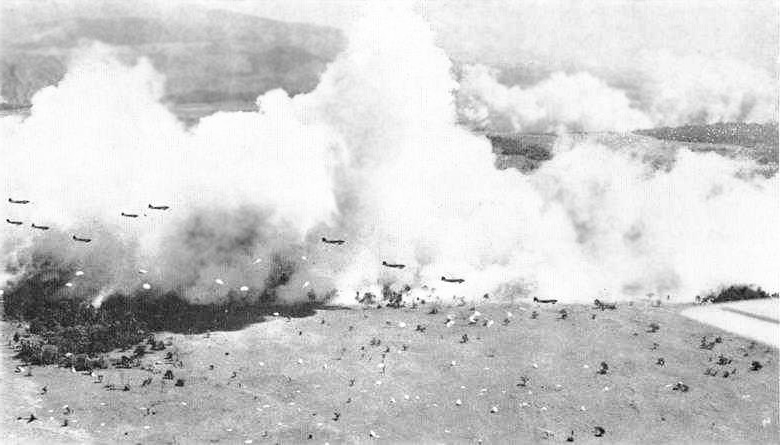
A smoke screen obstructing the view of the parachute landing at Nadzab, 1943

Smoke screens are usually used by infantry to conceal their movement in areas of enemy fire. They can also be used by armoured fighting vehicles, such as tanks, to conceal a withdrawal. They have regularly been used since earliest times to disorient or drive off attackers.

During the First World War the Germans used a lot of smoke screens (Nebel) to hide Batterie Pommern.

A toxic variant of the smokescreen was used and devised by Frank Arthur Brock who used it during the Zeebrugge Raid on 23 April 1918, the British Royal Navy's attempt to neutralize the key Belgian port of Bruges-Zeebrugge.

For the crossing of the Dnieper river in October 1943, the Red Army laid a smoke screen 30 kilometres (19 mi) long. At the Anzio beachhead in 1944, US Chemical Corps troops maintained a 25 km (16 mi) "light haze" smokescreen around the harbour throughout daylight hours, for two months. The density of this screen was adjusted to be sufficient to prevent observation by German forward observers in the surrounding hills, yet not inhibit port operations.

In the Vietnam War, "Smoke Ships" were introduced as part of a new Air Mobile Concept to protect crew and man on the ground from small arms fire. In 1964 and 1965, the "Smoke Ship" was first employed by the 145th Combat Aviation Battalion using the UH-1B.

=== Naval warfare ===
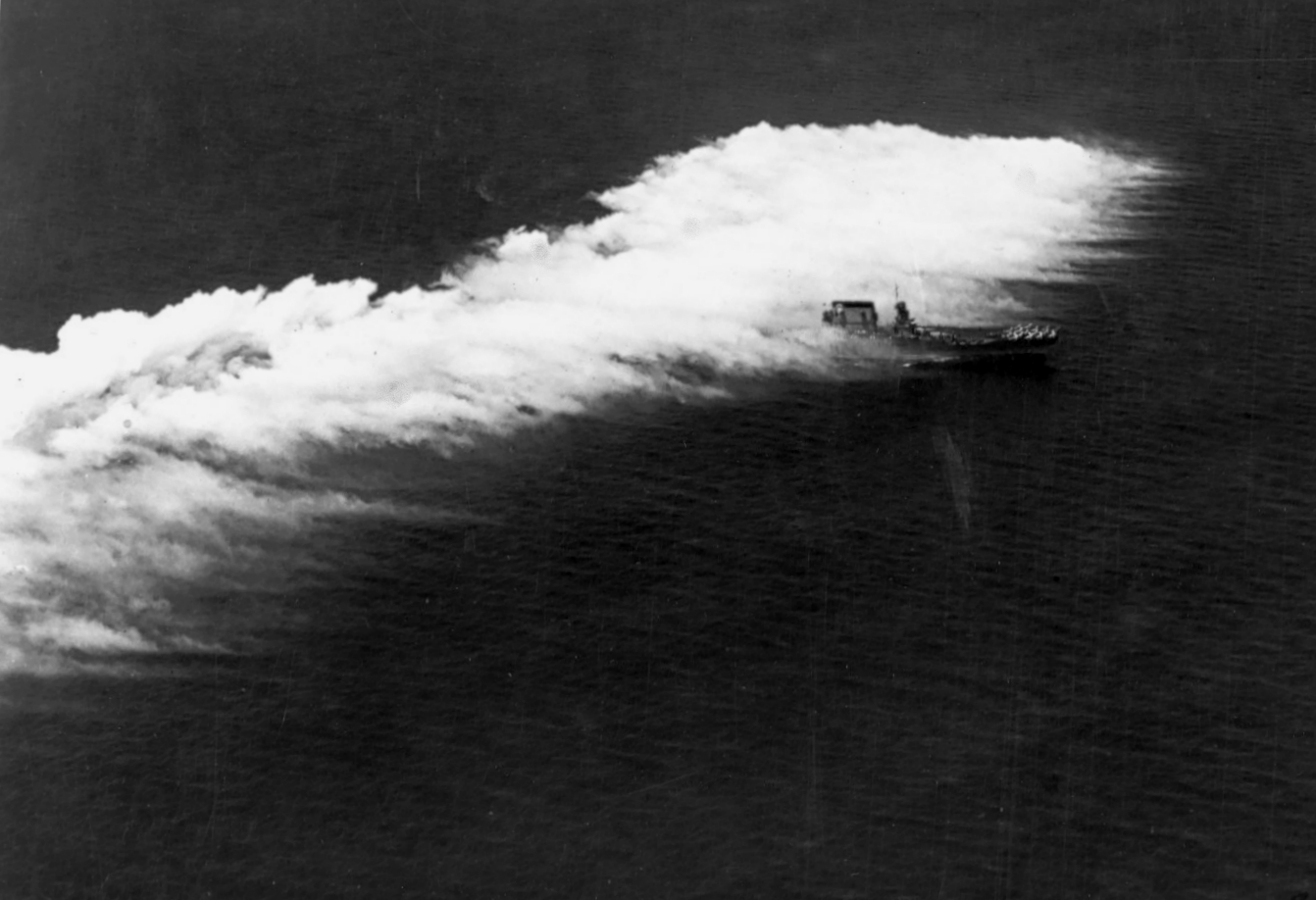
USS Lexington (CV-2) obscured by a smoke screen, 1929

There are a number of early examples of using incendiary weapons at sea, such as Greek fire, stinkpots, fire ships, and incendiaries on the decks of turtle ships, which also had the effect of creating smoke. The naval smoke screen is often said to have been proposed by Sir Thomas Cochrane in 1812, although Cochrane's proposal was as much an asphyxiant as an obscurant. It is not until the early twentieth century that there is clear evidence of deliberate use of large scale naval smokescreens as a major tactic.

During the American Civil War, the first smoke screen was used by the R.E. Lee, running the blockade and escaping the USS Iroquois.

The use of smoke screens was common in the naval battles of World War I and World War II.

== See also ==
- Early thermal weapons
- Military camouflage
- PT boat
- Smoke bomb
