= Thermite =

Pyrotechnic composition of metal powder and metal oxide

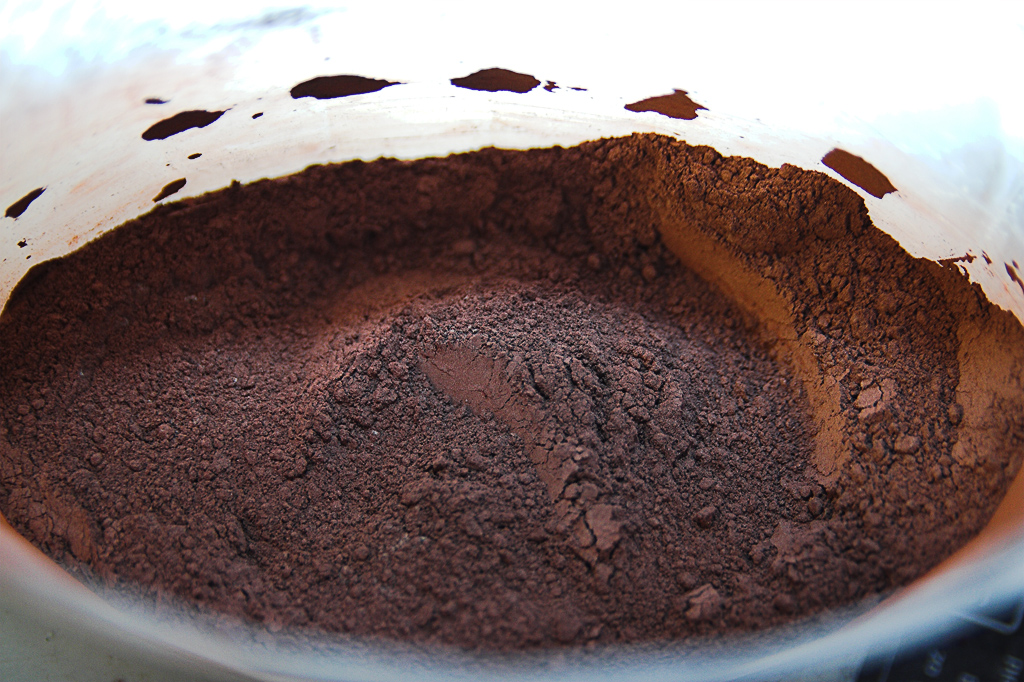
A thermite mixture using iron(III) oxide

Thermite (/ˈθɜːrmaɪt/) is a pyrotechnic composition of metal powder and metal oxide. When ignited by heat or chemical reaction, thermite undergoes an exothermic reduction-oxidation (redox) reaction. Most varieties are not explosive, but can create brief bursts of heat and high temperature in a small area. Its form of action is similar to that of other fuel-oxidizer mixtures, such as the explosive black powder.

Thermites have diverse compositions. Fuels include aluminium, magnesium, titanium, zinc, silicon, and boron. Aluminium is common because of its high boiling point and low cost. Oxidizers include bismuth(III) oxide, boron(III) oxide, silicon(IV) oxide, chromium(III) oxide, manganese(IV) oxide, iron(III) oxide, iron(II,III) oxide, copper(II) oxide, and lead(II,IV) oxide. In a thermochemical survey comprising twenty-five metals and thirty-two metal oxides, 288 out of 800 binary combinations were characterized by adiabatic temperatures greater than 2000 K. Combinations like these, which possess the thermodynamic potential to produce very high temperatures, are either already known to be reactive or are plausible thermitic systems.

The first thermite reaction was discovered in 1893 by the German chemist Hans Goldschmidt, who obtained a patent for his process. Today, thermite is used mainly for thermite welding, particularly for welding together railway tracks. Thermites have also been used in metal refining, disabling munitions, and in incendiary weapons. Some thermite-like mixtures are used as pyrotechnic initiators in fireworks.

== Chemical reactions ==
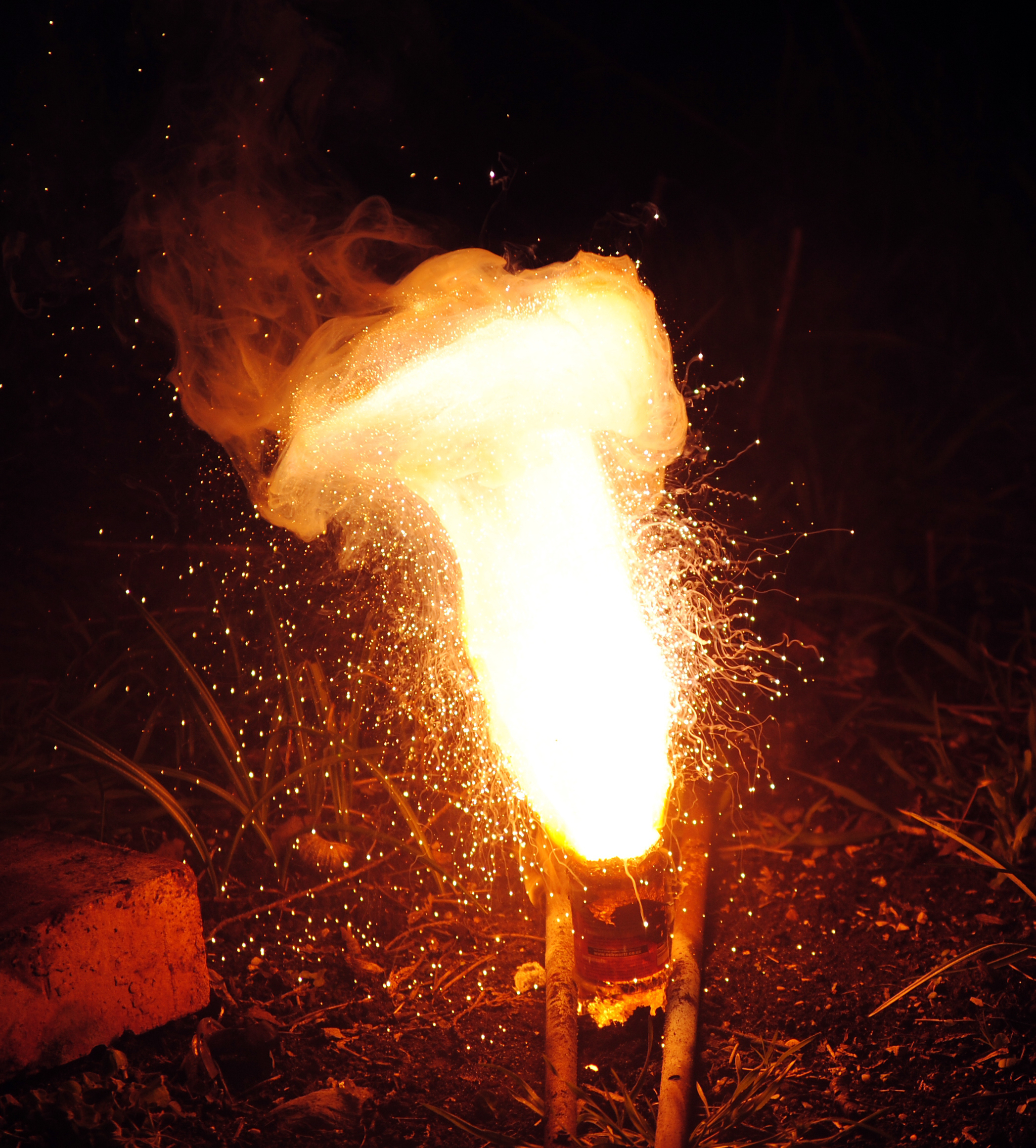
A thermite reaction using iron(III) oxide. The sparks flying outwards are globules of molten iron trailing smoke in their wake.

In the following example, elemental aluminium reduces the oxide of another metal, in this common example iron oxide, because aluminium forms stronger and more stable bonds with oxygen than iron:

$$\ce{Fe2O3 + 2Al -> 2Fe + Al2O3}$$

The products are aluminium oxide, elemental iron, and a large amount of heat. The reactants are commonly powdered and mixed with a binder to keep the material solid and prevent separation.

Other metal oxides can be used, such as chromium oxide, to generate the given metal in its elemental form. For example, a copper thermite reaction using copper oxide and elemental aluminum can be used for creating electric joints in a process called cadwelding, that produces elemental copper (it may react violently):

$$\ce{3CuO + 2Al -> 3Cu + Al2O3}$$

Thermites with nano-sized particles are described by a variety of terms, such as metastable intermolecular composites, super-thermite, nano-thermite, and nanocomposite energetic materials.

== History ==
The original German patent for thermite issued to the firm Th. Goldschmidt in 1898

The thermite (German: Thermit) reaction was discovered in 1893 and filed for patent in 1895 by German chemist Hans Goldschmidt. Consequently, the reaction is sometimes called the "Goldschmidt reaction" or "Goldschmidt process". Goldschmidt was originally interested in producing very pure metals by avoiding the use of carbon in smelting, but he soon discovered the value of thermite in welding.

The first commercial application of thermite was the welding of tram tracks in Essen in 1899.

== Types ==
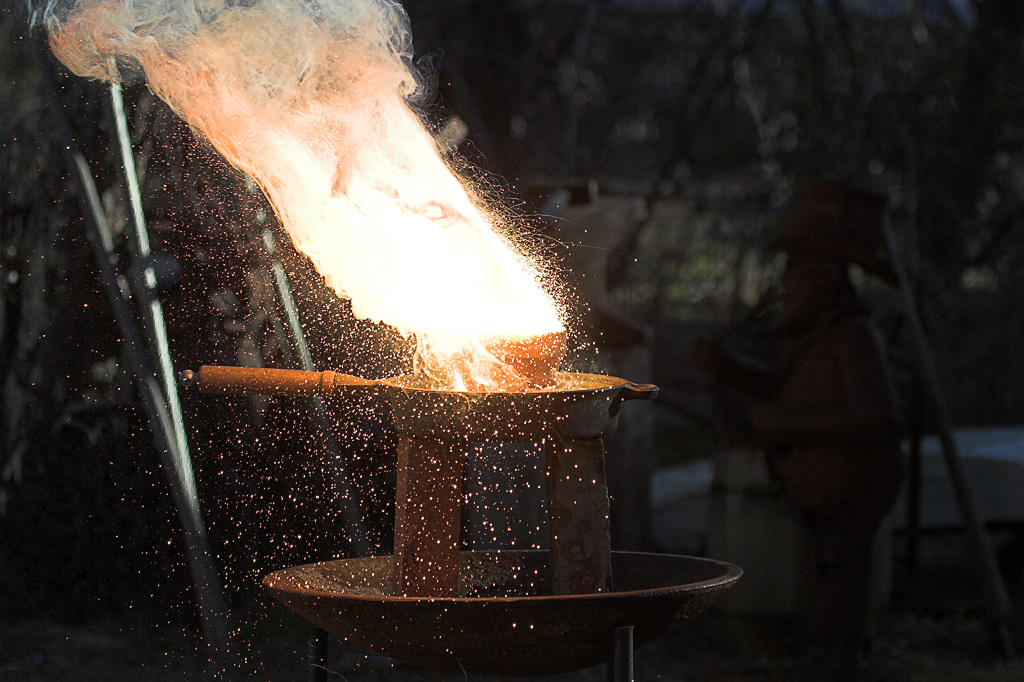
A thermite reaction taking place on a cast iron skillet

Red iron(III) oxide (Fe_{2}O_{3}, commonly known as rust) is the most common iron oxide used in thermite. Black iron(II,III) oxide (Fe_{3}O_{4}, magnetite) also works. Other oxides are occasionally used, such as MnO_{2} in manganese thermite, Cr_{2}O_{3} in chromium thermite, SiO_{2} (quartz) in silicon thermite, or copper(II) oxide in copper thermite, but only for specialized purposes. All of these examples use aluminium as the reactive metal. Fluoropolymers can be used in special formulations, Teflon with magnesium or aluminium being a relatively common example. Magnesium/Teflon/Viton is another pyrolant of this type.

Combinations of dry ice (frozen carbon dioxide) and reducing agents such as magnesium, aluminium and boron follow the same chemical reaction as with traditional thermite mixtures, producing metal oxides and carbon. Despite the very low temperature of a dry ice thermite mixture, such a system is capable of being ignited with a flame. When the ingredients are finely divided, confined in a pipe and armed like a traditional explosive, this cryo-thermite is detonatable and a portion of the carbon liberated in the reaction emerges in the form of diamond.

In principle, any reactive metal could be used instead of aluminium. This is rarely done, because the properties of aluminium are nearly ideal for this reaction:

- It forms a passivation layer making it safer to handle than many other reactive metals.
- Its relatively low melting point (660 °C) means that it is easy to melt the metal, so that the reaction can occur mainly in the liquid phase, thus it proceeds fairly quickly.
- Its high boiling point (2519 °C) enables the reaction to reach very high temperatures, since several processes tend to limit the maximum temperature to just below the boiling point. Such a high boiling point is common among transition metals (e.g., iron and copper boil at 2887 and 2582 °C, respectively), but is especially unusual among the highly reactive metals (cf. magnesium and sodium, which boil at 1090 and 883 °C, respectively).
- Further, the low density of the aluminum oxide formed as a result of the reaction tends to leave it floating on the resultant pure metal. This is particularly important for reducing contamination in a weld.

Although the reactants are stable at room temperature, they burn with an extremely intense exothermic reaction when they are heated to ignition temperature. The products emerge as liquids due to the high temperatures reached (up to 2500 °C (4532 °F) with iron(III) oxide)—although the actual temperature reached depends on how quickly heat can escape to the surrounding environment. Thermite contains its own supply of oxygen and does not require any external source of air. Consequently, it cannot be smothered, and may ignite in any environment given sufficient initial heat. It burns well while wet, and cannot be easily extinguished with water—though enough water to remove sufficient heat may stop the reaction. Small amounts of water boil before reaching the reaction. Even so, thermite is used for welding under water.

The thermites are characterized by almost complete absence of gas production during burning, high reaction temperature, and production of molten slag. The fuel should have high heat of combustion and produce oxides with low melting point and high boiling point. The oxidizer should contain at least 25% oxygen, have high density, low heat of formation, and produce metal with low melting and high boiling points (so the energy released is not consumed in evaporation of reaction products). Organic binders can be added to the composition to improve its mechanical properties, but they tend to produce endothermic decomposition products, causing some loss of reaction heat and production of gases.

The temperature achieved during the reaction determines the outcome. In an ideal case, the reaction produces a well-separated melt of metal and slag. For this, the temperature must be high enough to melt both reaction products, the resulting metal and the fuel oxide. Too low a temperature produces a mixture of sintered metal and slag; too high a temperature (above the boiling point of any reactant or product) leads to rapid production of gas, dispersing the burning reaction mixture, sometimes with effects similar to a low-yield explosion. In compositions intended for production of metal by aluminothermic reaction, these effects can be counteracted. Too low a reaction temperature (e.g., when producing silicon from sand) can be boosted with addition of a suitable oxidizer (e.g., sulfur in aluminium-sulfur-sand compositions); too high a temperature can be reduced by using a suitable coolant or slag flux. The flux often used in amateur compositions is calcium fluoride, as it reacts only minimally, has relatively low melting point, low melt viscosity at high temperatures (therefore increasing fluidity of the slag) and forms a eutectic with alumina. Too much flux, however, dilutes the reactants to the point of not being able to sustain combustion. The type of metal oxide also has dramatic influence to the amount of energy produced; the higher the oxide, the higher the amount of energy produced. A good example is the difference between manganese(IV) oxide and manganese(II) oxide, where the former produces too high temperature and the latter is barely able to sustain combustion; to achieve good results, a mixture with proper ratio of both oxides can be used.

The reaction rate can be also tuned with particle sizes; coarser particles burn slower than finer particles. The effect is more pronounced with the particles requiring heating to higher temperature to start reacting. This effect is pushed to the extreme with nano-thermites.

The temperature achieved in the reaction in adiabatic conditions, when no heat is lost to the environment, can be estimated using Hess's law – by calculating the energy produced by the reaction itself (subtracting the enthalpy of the reactants from the enthalpy of the products) and subtracting the energy consumed by heating the products (from their specific heat, when the materials only change their temperature, and their enthalpy of fusion and eventually enthalpy of vaporization, when the materials melt or boil). In real conditions, the reaction loses heat to the environment; the achieved temperature is therefore somewhat lower. The heat transfer rate is finite, so the faster the reaction is, the closer to adiabatic condition it runs and the higher is the achieved temperature.

=== Iron thermite ===
The most common composition is iron thermite. The oxidizer used is usually either iron(III) oxide or iron(II,III) oxide. The former produces more heat. The latter is easier to ignite, likely due to the crystal structure of the oxide. Addition of copper or manganese oxides can significantly improve the ease of ignition. The density of prepared thermite is often as low as 0.7 g/cm^{3}. This, in turn, results in relatively poor energy density (about 3 kJ/cm^{3}), rapid burn times, and spray of molten iron due to the expansion of trapped air. Thermite can be pressed to densities as high as 4.9 g/cm^{3} (almost 16 kJ/cm^{3}) with slow burning speeds (about 1 cm/s). Pressed thermite has higher melting power, i.e. it can melt a steel cup where a low-density thermite would fail. Iron thermite with or without additives can be pressed into cutting devices that have heat-resistant casing and a nozzle. Oxygen-balanced iron thermite 2Al + Fe_{2}O_{3} has theoretical maximum density of 4.175 g/cm^{3} an adiabatic burn temperature of 3135 K or 2862 °C or 5183 °F (with phase transitions included, limited by iron, which boils at 3135 K), the aluminium oxide is (briefly) molten and the produced iron is mostly liquid with part of it being in gaseous form - 78.4 g of iron vapor per kg of thermite are produced. The energy content is 945.4 cal/g (3 956 J/g). The energy density is 16,516 J/cm^{3}.

The original mixture, as invented, used iron oxide in the form of mill scale. The composition was very difficult to ignite.

=== Copper thermite ===
Copper thermite can be prepared using either copper(I) oxide (Cu_{2}O, red) or copper(II) oxide (CuO, black). The burn rate tends to be very fast and the melting point of copper is relatively low, so the reaction produces a significant amount of molten copper in a very short time. Copper(II) thermite reactions can be so fast that it can be considered a type of flash powder. An explosion can occur, which sends a spray of copper drops to considerable distances. Oxygen-balanced mixture has theoretical maximum density of 5.109 g/cm^{3}, adiabatic flame temperature 2843 K (phase transitions included) with the aluminum oxide being molten and copper in both liquid and gaseous form; 343 g of copper vapor per kg of this thermite are produced. The energy content is 974 cal/g.

Copper(I) thermite has industrial uses in e.g., welding of thick copper conductors (cadwelding). This kind of welding is being evaluated also for cable splicing on the US Navy fleet, for use in high-current systems, e.g., electric propulsion. Oxygen-balanced mixture has theoretical maximum density of 5.280 g/cm^{3}, adiabatic flame temperature 2843 K (phase transitions included) with the aluminum oxide being molten and copper in both liquid and gaseous form; 77.6 g of copper vapor per kg of this thermite are produced. The energy content is 575.5 cal/g.

=== Thermates ===
Thermate composition is a thermite enriched with a salt-based oxidizer (usually nitrates, e.g., barium nitrate, or peroxides). In contrast with thermites, thermates burn with evolution of flame and gases. The presence of the oxidizer makes the mixture easier to ignite and improves penetration of target by the burning composition, as the evolved gas is projecting the molten slag and providing mechanical agitation. This mechanism makes thermate more suitable than thermite for incendiary purposes and for emergency destruction of sensitive equipment (e.g., cryptographic devices), as thermite's effect is more localized.

== Ignition ==
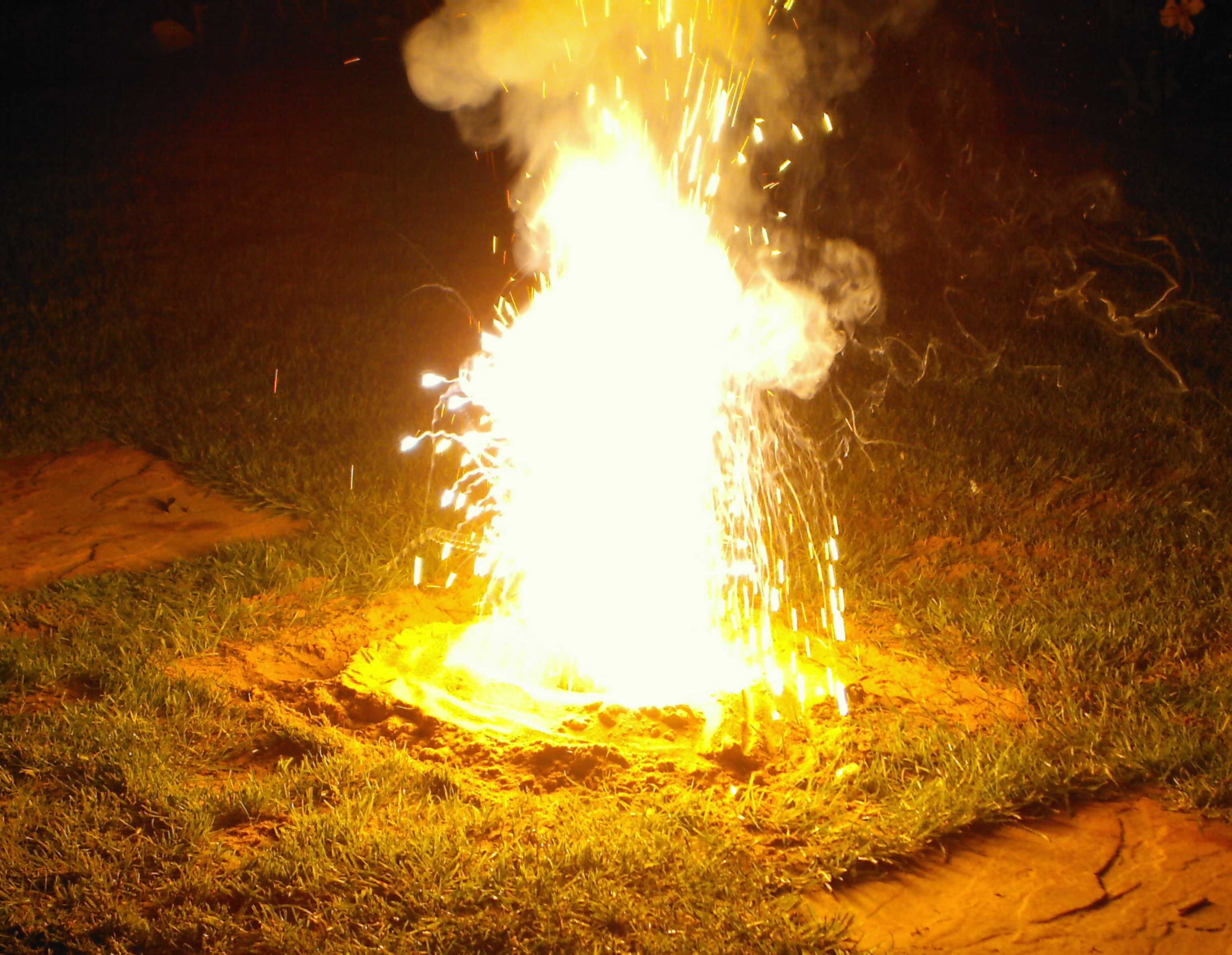
A thermite reaction using iron(III) oxide

Metals, under the right conditions, burn in a process similar to the combustion of wood or gasoline. In fact, rust is the result of oxidation of steel or iron at very slow rates. A thermite reaction results when the correct mixtures of metallic fuels combine and ignite. Ignition itself requires extremely high temperatures.

Ignition of a thermite reaction normally requires a sparkler or easily obtainable magnesium ribbon, but may require persistent efforts, as ignition can be unreliable and unpredictable. These temperatures cannot be reached with conventional black powder fuses, nitrocellulose rods, detonators, pyrotechnic initiators, or other common igniting substances. Even when the thermite is hot enough to glow bright red, it does not ignite, as it has a very high ignition temperature. Starting the reaction is possible using a propane torch if done correctly.

Often, strips of magnesium metal are used as fuses. Because metals burn without releasing cooling gases, they can potentially burn at extremely high temperatures. Reactive metals such as magnesium can easily reach temperatures sufficiently high for thermite ignition. Magnesium ignition remains popular among amateur thermite users, mainly because it can be easily obtained, but a piece of the burning strip can fall off into the mixture, resulting in premature ignition.

The reaction between potassium permanganate and glycerol or ethylene glycol is used as an alternative to the magnesium method. When these two substances mix, a spontaneous reaction begins, slowly increasing the temperature of the mixture until it produces flames. The heat released by the oxidation of glycerine is sufficient to initiate a thermite reaction.

Apart from magnesium ignition, some amateurs also choose to use sparklers to ignite the thermite mixture. These reach the necessary temperatures and provide enough time before the burning point reaches the sample. This can be a dangerous method, as the iron sparks, like the magnesium strips, burn at thousands of degrees and can ignite the thermite, though the sparkler itself is not in contact with it. This is especially dangerous with finely powdered thermite.

Match heads burn hot enough to ignite thermite. Use of match heads enveloped with aluminum foil and a sufficiently long viscofuse/electric match leading to the match heads is possible.

Similarly, finely powdered thermite can be ignited by a flint spark lighter, as the sparks are burning metal (in this case, the highly reactive rare-earth metals lanthanum and cerium). Therefore, it is unsafe to strike a lighter close to thermite.

== Civilian uses ==
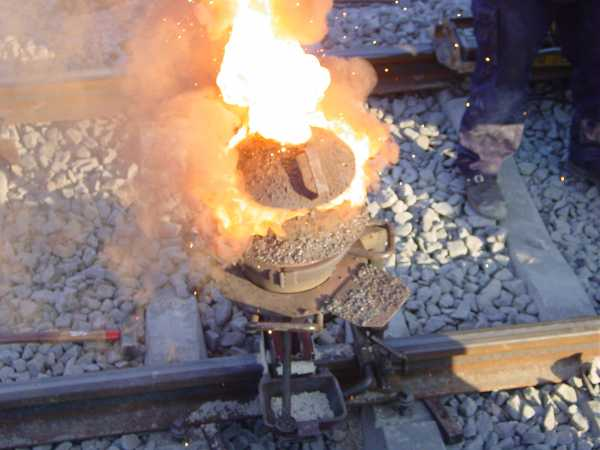
Thermite reaction proceeding for a railway welding. Shortly afterwards, the liquid iron flows into the mould around the rail gap.

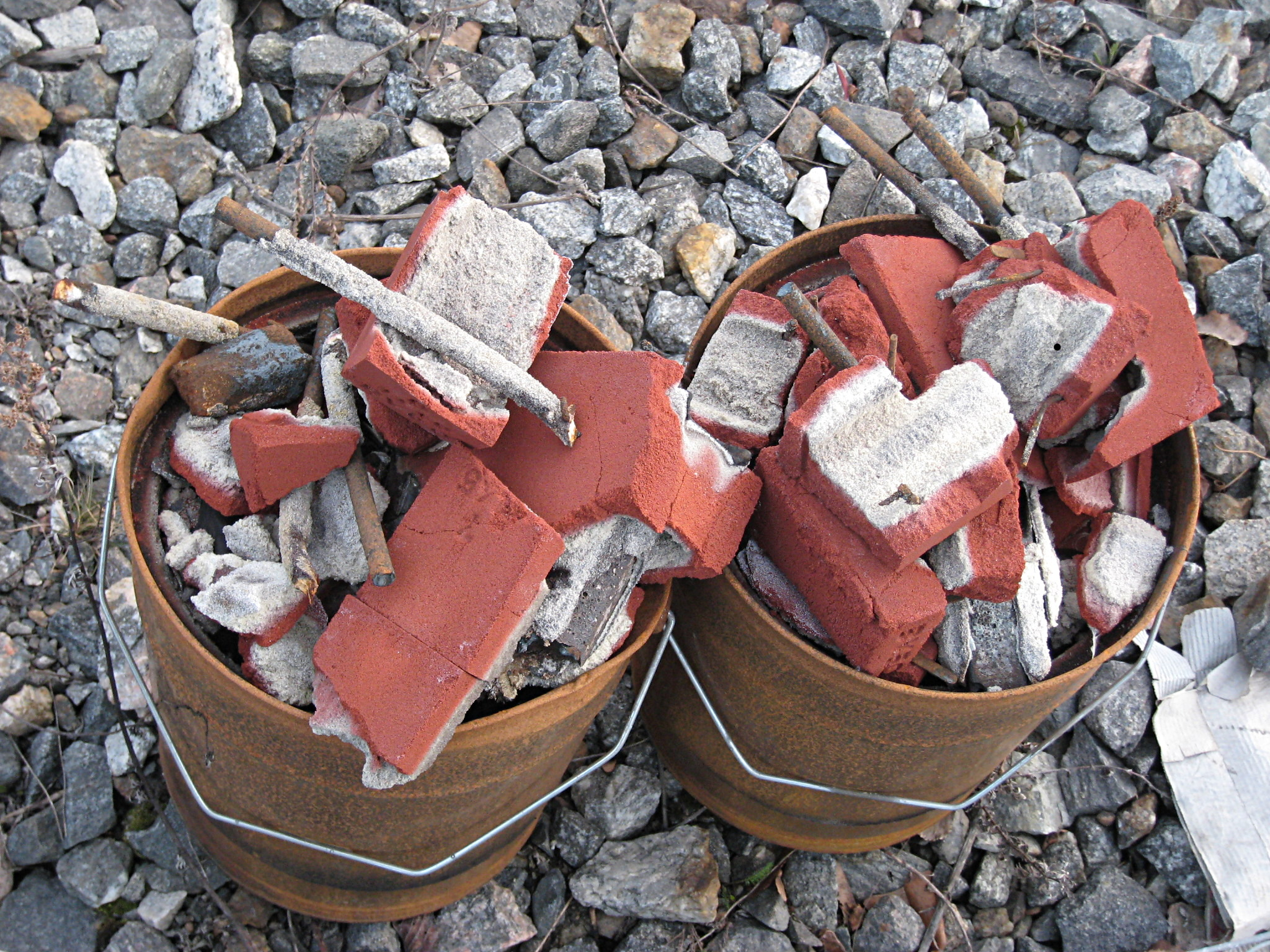
Remains of ceramic moulds used for thermite welding like the ones pictured here, left by railway workers near Årstafältet tramway station in Stockholm, Sweden, can sometimes be found along tracks.

Thermite reactions have many uses. It is not an explosive; instead, it operates by exposing a very small area to extremely high temperatures. Intense heat focused on a small spot can be used to cut through metal or weld metal components together both by melting metal from the components, and by injecting molten metal from the thermite reaction itself.

Thermite may be used for repair by the welding in-place of thick steel sections such as locomotive axle-frames where the repair can take place without removing the part from its installed location.

Thermite can be used for quickly cutting or welding steel such as rail tracks, without requiring complex or heavy equipment. However, defects such as slag inclusions and voids (holes) are often present in such welded junctions, so great care is needed to operate the process successfully. The numerical analysis of thermite welding of rails has been approached similar to casting cooling analysis. Both this finite element analysis and experimental analysis of thermite rail welds has shown that weld gap is the most influential parameter affecting defect formation. Increasing weld gap has been shown to reduce shrinkage cavity formation and cold lap welding defects, and increasing preheat and thermite temperature further reduces these defects. However, reducing these defects promotes a second form of defect: microporosity. Care must also be taken to ensure that the rails remain straight, without resulting in dipped joints, which can cause wear on high speed and heavy axle load lines. Studies to make the hardness of thermite welds to repair tracks have made improvements to the hardness to compare more to the original tracks while keeping its portable nature.

As the reaction of thermite is oxidation-reduction and environmentally friendly, it has started to be adapted into use for sealing oil wells instead of using concrete. Though thermite is usually in a powder-state, a diluted mixture can reduce damage to the surroundings during the process, though too much alumina can risk hurting the integrity of the seal. A higher concentration of mixture was needed to melt the plastic of a model tube, making it a favorable mixture. Other experiments have been done to simulate the heat flux of the well sealing to predict the temperature on the surface of the seal over time.

A thermite reaction, when used to purify the ores of some metals, is called the thermite process, or aluminothermic reaction. An adaptation of the reaction, used to obtain pure uranium, was developed as part of the Manhattan Project at Ames Laboratory under the direction of Frank Spedding. It is sometimes called the Ames process.

Copper thermite is used for welding together thick copper wires for the purpose of electrical connections. It is used extensively by the electrical utilities and telecommunications industries (exothermic welded connections).

== Military uses ==
Thermite hand grenades and charges are typically used by armed forces in both an anti-materiel role and in the partial destruction of equipment, the latter being common when time is not available for safer or more thorough methods. For example, thermite can be used for the emergency destruction of cryptographic equipment when there is a danger that it might be captured by enemy troops. Because standard iron-thermite is difficult to ignite, burns with practically no flame and has a small radius of action, standard thermite is rarely used on its own as an incendiary composition. In general, an increase in the volume of gaseous reaction products of a thermite blend increases the heat transfer rate (and therefore damage) of that particular thermite blend. It is usually used with other ingredients that increase its incendiary effects. Thermate-TH3 is a mixture of thermite and pyrotechnic additives that have been found superior to standard thermite for incendiary purposes. Its composition by weight is generally about 68.7% thermite, 29.0% barium nitrate, 2.0% sulfur, and 0.3% of a binder (such as PBAN). The addition of barium nitrate to thermite increases its thermal effect, produces a larger flame, and significantly reduces the ignition temperature. Although the primary purpose of Thermate-TH3 by the armed forces is as an incendiary anti-materiel weapon, it also has uses in welding together metal components.

A classic military use for thermite is disabling artillery pieces, and it has been used for this purpose since World War II, such as at Pointe du Hoc, Normandy. Because it permanently disables artillery pieces without the use of explosive charges, thermite can be used when silence is necessary to an operation. This can be accomplished by inserting one or more armed thermite grenades into the breech, then quickly closing it; this welds the breech shut and makes loading the weapon impossible.

During World War II, both German and Allied incendiary bombs used thermite mixtures. Incendiary bombs usually consisted of dozens of thin, thermite-filled canisters (bomblets) ignited by a magnesium fuse. Incendiary bombs created massive damage in numerous cities due to the fires started by the thermite. Cities that primarily consisted of wooden buildings were especially susceptible. These incendiary bombs were used primarily during nighttime air raids. Bombsights could not be used at night, creating the need for munitions that could destroy targets without requiring precision placement.

So called Dragon drones equipped with thermite munitions were used by the Ukrainian army during the Russian invasion of Ukraine against Russian positions.

== Hazards ==
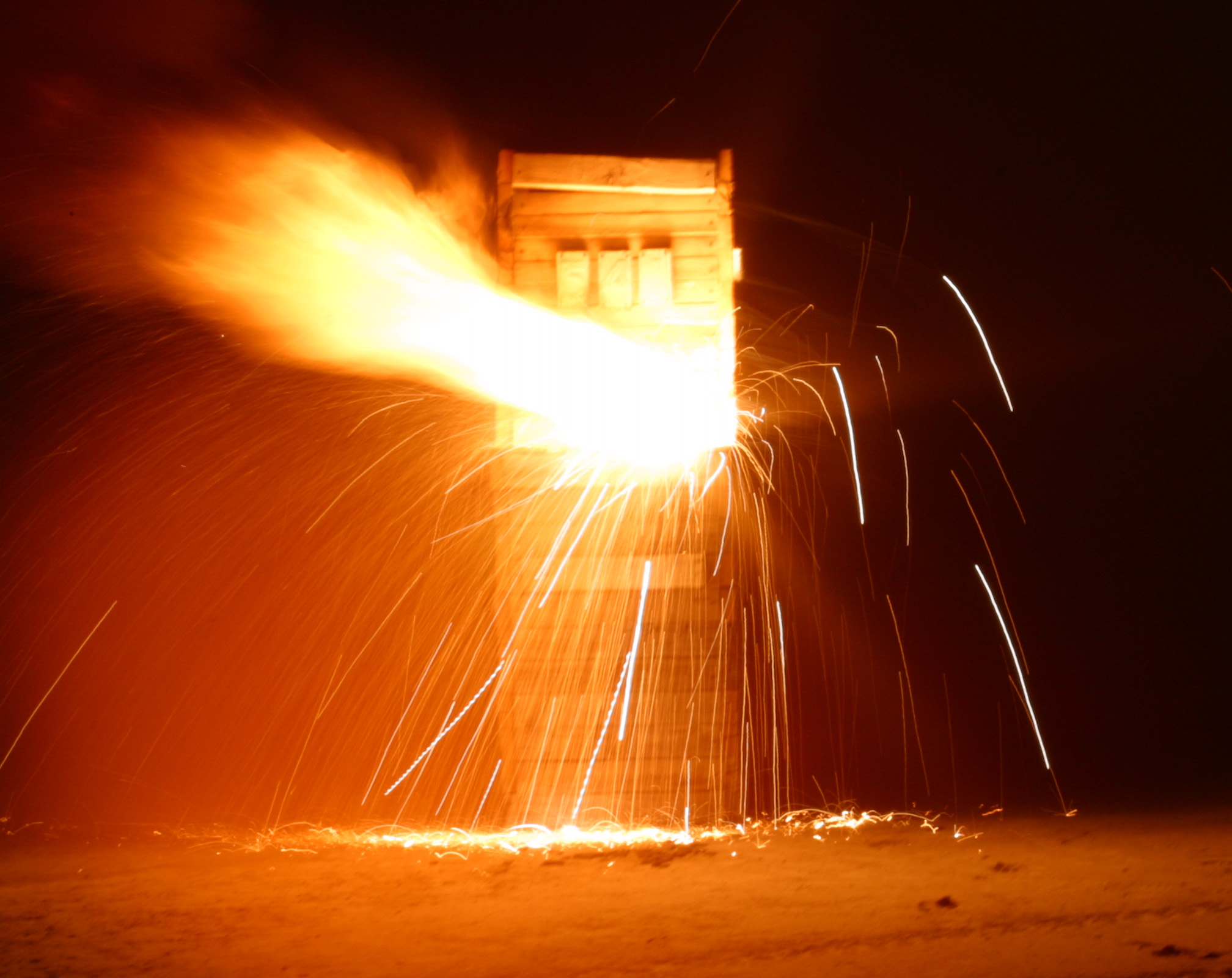
The violent effects of thermite

Thermite usage is hazardous due to the extremely high temperatures produced and the extreme difficulty in smothering a reaction once initiated. Small streams of molten iron released in the reaction can travel considerable distances and may melt through metal containers, igniting their contents. Additionally, flammable metals with relatively low boiling points such as zinc (with a boiling point of 907 °C, which is about 1,370 °C below the temperature at which thermite burns) could potentially spray superheated boiling metal violently into the air if near a thermite reaction.

If, for some reason, thermite is contaminated with organics, hydrated oxides and other compounds able to produce gases upon heating or reaction with thermite components, the reaction products may be sprayed. Moreover, if the thermite mixture contains enough empty spaces with air and burns fast enough, the super-heated air also may cause the mixture to spray. For this reason it is preferable to use relatively crude powders, so the reaction rate is moderate and hot gases could escape the reaction zone.

Preheating of thermite before ignition can easily be done accidentally, for example by pouring a new pile of thermite over a hot, recently ignited pile of thermite slag. When ignited, preheated thermite can burn almost instantaneously, releasing light and heat energy at a much higher rate than normal and causing burns and eye damage at what would normally be a reasonably safe distance.

The thermite reaction can take place accidentally in industrial locations where workers use abrasive grinding and cutting wheels with ferrous metals. Using aluminium in this situation produces a mixture of oxides that can explode violently.

Mixing water with thermite or pouring water onto burning thermite can cause a steam explosion, spraying hot fragments in all directions.

Thermite's main ingredients were also utilized for their individual qualities, specifically reflectivity and heat insulation, in a paint coating or dope for the German zeppelin Hindenburg, possibly contributing to its fiery destruction. This was a theory put forward by the former NASA scientist Addison Bain, and later tested in small scale by the scientific reality-TV show MythBusters with semi-inconclusive results (it was proven not to be the fault of the thermite reaction alone, but instead conjectured to be a combination of that and the burning of hydrogen gas that filled the body of the Hindenburg). The MythBusters program also tested the veracity of a video found on the Internet, whereby a quantity of thermite in a metal bucket was ignited while sitting on top of several blocks of ice, causing a sudden explosion. They were able to confirm the results, finding huge chunks of ice as far as 50 m from the point of explosion. Co-host Jamie Hyneman conjectured that this was due to the thermite mixture aerosolizing, perhaps in a cloud of steam, causing it to burn even faster. Hyneman also voiced skepticism about another theory explaining the phenomenon: that the reaction somehow separated the hydrogen and oxygen in the ice and then ignited them. This explanation claims that the explosion is due to the reaction of high temperature molten aluminium with water. Aluminium reacts violently with water or steam at high temperatures, releasing hydrogen and oxidizing in the process. The speed of that reaction and the ignition of the resulting hydrogen can easily account for the explosion verified. This process is akin to the explosive reaction caused by dropping metallic potassium into water.

== See also ==
- ALICE (propellant) – Nano-aluminum powder rocket propellant
- Thermal lance – Thermal tool that cuts dense heavy materials
