= M58 Wolf =

US smoke-generation vehicle

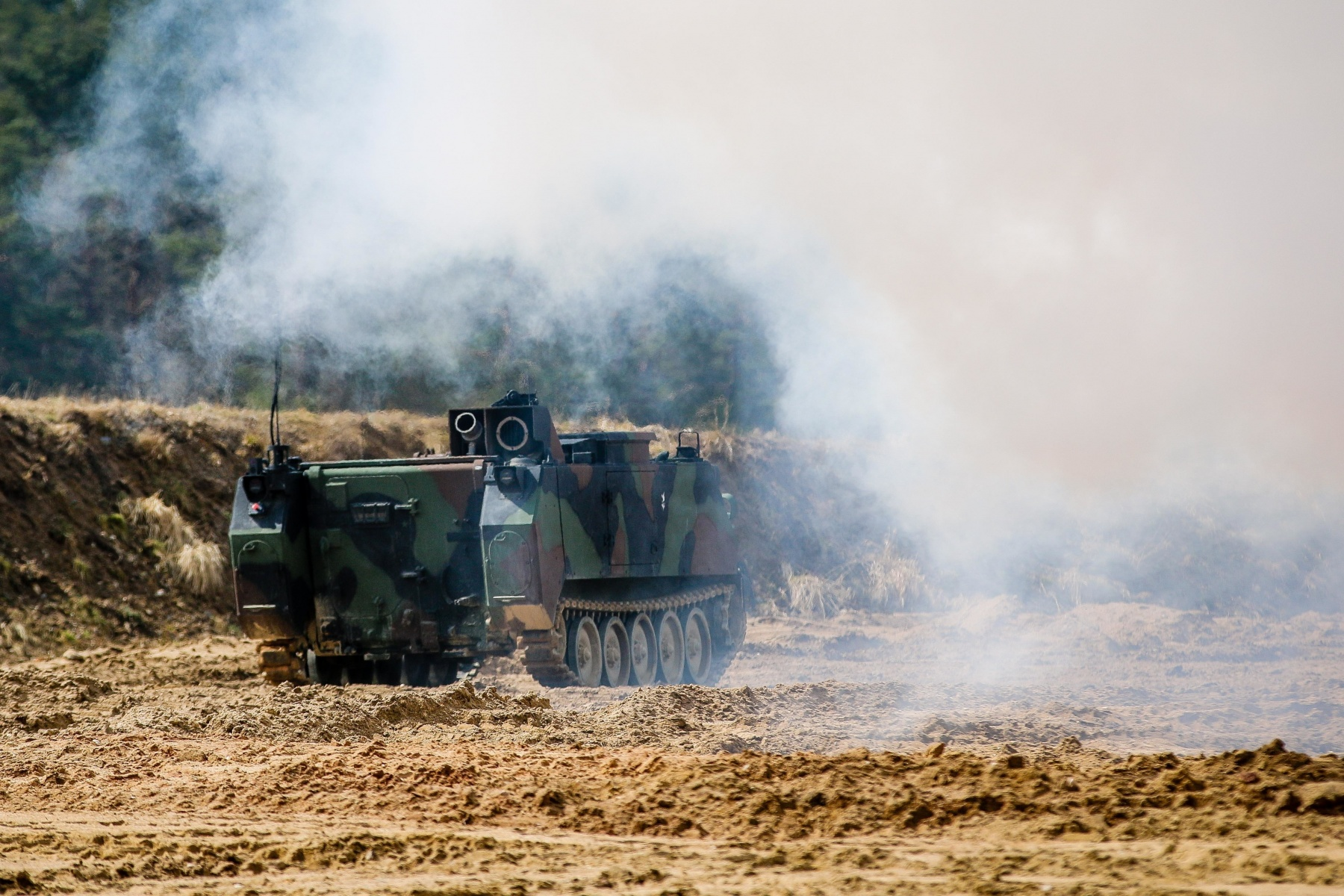
A M58 Wolf at Grafenwöhr Training Area, 2018

The M58 Wolf is an agile, armored reconnaissance vehicle of the United States Army, capable of producing smoke screens to block both visual and infrared detection. Large area multispectral obscurant smoke screening is used to obscure the presence and location of troops and artillery.

A typical platoon of seven M58 vehicles acts as cover support on tactical missions. Two groups of three M58 Wolves create a perimeter, circling troops and vehicles which are to be hidden. The seventh vehicle leads the platoon, coordinating maneuvers that provide the thickest and largest area of cover.

== Construction ==
The M58 system is made up of an M56 smoke generation unit built onto an M113 type chassis. The M113 chassis was designed as a fully tracked armoured personnel carrier, light enough to be transported via airplane, yet still moderately armored. The vehicle can carry a payload of cargo, troops, and a crew of three.

With its mechanical foundation based on an upgraded 275 horsepower (205 kW) diesel engine, four speed hydrostatic transmission, and large external fuel tanks it is capable of providing side-by-side support with even the most agile Abrams and Bradley AFVs.

== Smoke generation ==
Without replenishment of smoke producing agents, the M58 can produce ninety minutes of thick, visually impairing smoke, or thirty minutes of infra-red obscuring haze. This screen effectively blocks infrared range finding as well as conventional night vision technologies. A future smoke capability, based on millimeter wave technology, could also be used to block higher-frequency radar systems.

The system generates smoke by vaporizing medium viscosity oil in a specially designed exhaust manifold. The hot vapors form a thick, white cloud. Other components may be added to the oil to form different types of cloaking hazes. Infrared smoke has special components added so that infrared light is refracted along with the full visual spectrum.

== See also ==
- M56 Coyote
- Smoke screen
