= Ferrotitanium =

Alloy of titanium and iron

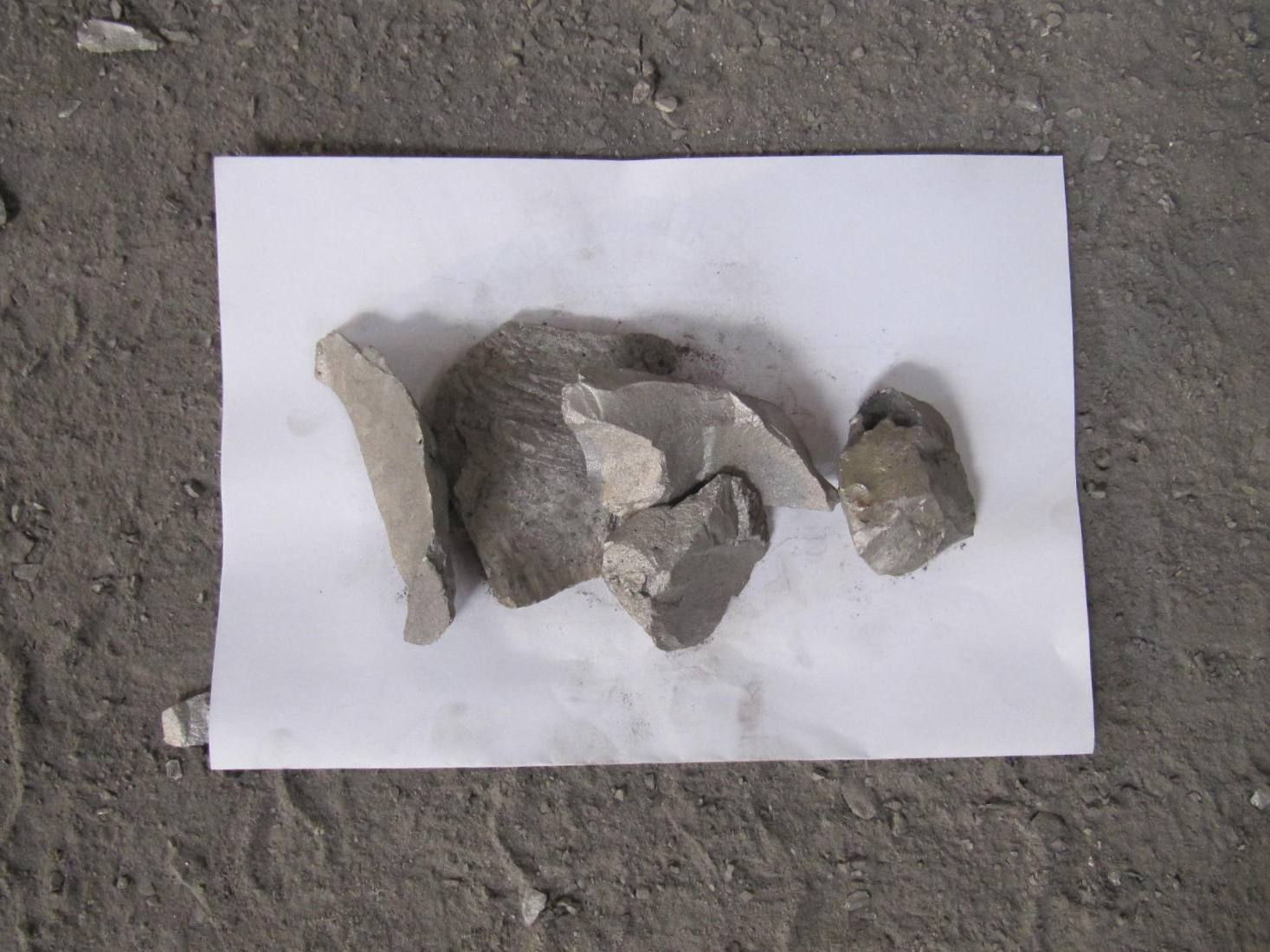
Samples of ferrotitanium with 70% titanium content, used in the steel industry (placed on A4 sheet)

Ferrotitanium is a ferroalloy, an alloy of iron and titanium with between 10 and 20% iron and 45–75% titanium and sometimes a small amount of carbon. It is used in steelmaking as a cleansing agent for iron and steel; the titanium is highly reactive with sulfur, carbon, oxygen, and nitrogen, forming insoluble compounds and sequestering them in slag, and is therefore used for deoxidizing, and sometimes for desulfurization and denitrogenation. In steelmaking, the addition of titanium yields metal with finer grain structure. Ferrotitanium can be manufactured by mixing titanium sponge and scrap with iron and melting them together in an induction furnace. Ferrotitanium powder can be also used as a fuel in some pyrotechnic compositions.
