= Pyrolant =

Special pyrotechnic term

A pyrolant (from Greek pyr, fire) is an energetic material that generates hot flames upon combustion. Pyrolants are metal-based pyrotechnic compositions containing virtually any oxidizer. The term was originally coined by Kuwahara in 1992, in a paper on magnesium/Teflon/Viton, to distinguish between compositions that serve as propellants and those yielding hot flames which are not necessarily suitable for propellant purposes.

Thermites constitute a subdivision of pyrolants referring to mixtures containing a narrow range of oxygen-based oxidizers only, Hence the term thermite cannot be used interchangeably with "pyrolant".

A similar common term is propellant, which describes either a homogeneous or composite material that generates thrust upon combustion, but which may contain fuels instead of or in addition to the metals contained in thermites.

Pyrolants are generally characterized by high combustion temperatures (> 2000 K) and high amounts of condensed reaction products at equilibrium conditions such as metal oxides, fluorides and soot. Typical pyrolants find use as pyrotechnic initiators (Zr/BaCrO_{4} or Zr/KClO_{4}), illuminating flare (Mg/NaNO_{3}) and decoy flare compositions (Mg/(C_{2}F_{4})_{n})
