= Smoke composition =

Pyrotechnic composition to generate smoke

A smoke composition is a pyrotechnic composition designed primarily to generate smoke. Smoke compositions are used as obscurants or for generation of signaling smokes. Some are used as a payload of smoke bombs and smoke grenades.

== Obscurants ==
Commonly, smoke compositions used as obscurants generate large amount of thick, usually white, smoke.

=== Zinc chloride smoke ===
Zinc chloride smoke is grey-white and consists of tiny particles of zinc chloride. The most common mixture for generating these is a zinc chloride smoke mixture (HC), consisting of hexachloroethane, grained aluminium and zinc oxide. The smoke consists of zinc chloride, zinc oxychlorides, and hydrochloric acid, which absorb the moisture in the air. The smoke also contains traces of organic chlorinated compounds, phosgene, carbon monoxide, and chlorine.

Its toxicity is caused mainly by the content of strongly acidic hydrochloric acid, but also due to thermal effects of reaction of zinc chloride with water. These effects cause lesions of the mucous membranes of the upper airways. Damage of the lower airways can manifest itself later as well, due to fine particles of zinc chloride and traces of phosgene. In high concentrations the smoke can be very dangerous when inhaled. Symptoms include dyspnea, retrosternal pain, hoarseness, stridor, lachrymation, cough, expectoration, and in some cases haemoptysis. Delayed pulmonary edema, cyanosis or bronchopneumonia may develop. The smoke and the spent canisters contain suspected carcinogens.

The prognosis for the casualties depends on the degree of the pulmonary damage. All exposed individuals should be kept under observation for 8 hours. Most affected individuals recover within several days, with some symptoms persisting for up to 1–2 weeks. Severe cases can suffer of reduced pulmonary function for some months, the worst cases developing marked dyspnoea and cyanosis leading to death.

Respirators are required for people coming into contact with the zinc chloride smoke.

=== White phosphorus ===
White phosphorus is a popular base for smoke production. It is used in artillery shells, bombs, and grenades.

== Signalling ==
A colored smoke composition can be used for signalling. These are usually based on a low-temperature burning pyrotechnic composition, mixed with a dye that gets vaporized and creates large, colored smoke particles. The composition is often based on an oxidizer (e.g. potassium chlorate, potassium nitrate, or potassium perchlorate), a fuel (e.g. lactose), an optional coolant (e.g. sodium bicarbonate), and one or more dyes.

== Fire extinguishing ==
Smoke with a suitable composition can be used as a fire suppression agent. A pyrotechnic composition similar to black powder, composed of 15% charcoal and 85% potassium nitrate, generates thick smoke composed of particles of mainly potassium carbonate, which has fire extinguishing properties. Two-kilograms smoke grenades, thrown into burning rooms through plate-glass windows, have been used by some European firefighters.

== Dispersion of chemicals ==
Smoke compositions can be used also for creating aerosol of other materials than dyes. Generally the same type of pyrotechnic composition as for colored smokes is used, with the dye being replaced by the desired chemical. The devices usually have the form of smoke bombs.

The best known such application of smoke compositions is in riot control, for dispersion of lachrymatory agents. The agent used is most often CS gas, with less used alternatives CR gas, CN gas and Adamsite.

In agriculture, smoke compositions are used to disperse insecticides and fungicides. Some agents used in this manner are permethrin, cypermethrin, chlorpyrifos, imazalil, etc., and some fumigation agents.

Smoke compositions can be also used for weather modification, namely cloud seeding, to provide cloud condensation nuclei for the moisture to precipitate.
