= M56 Coyote =

US Army mobile smoke generator

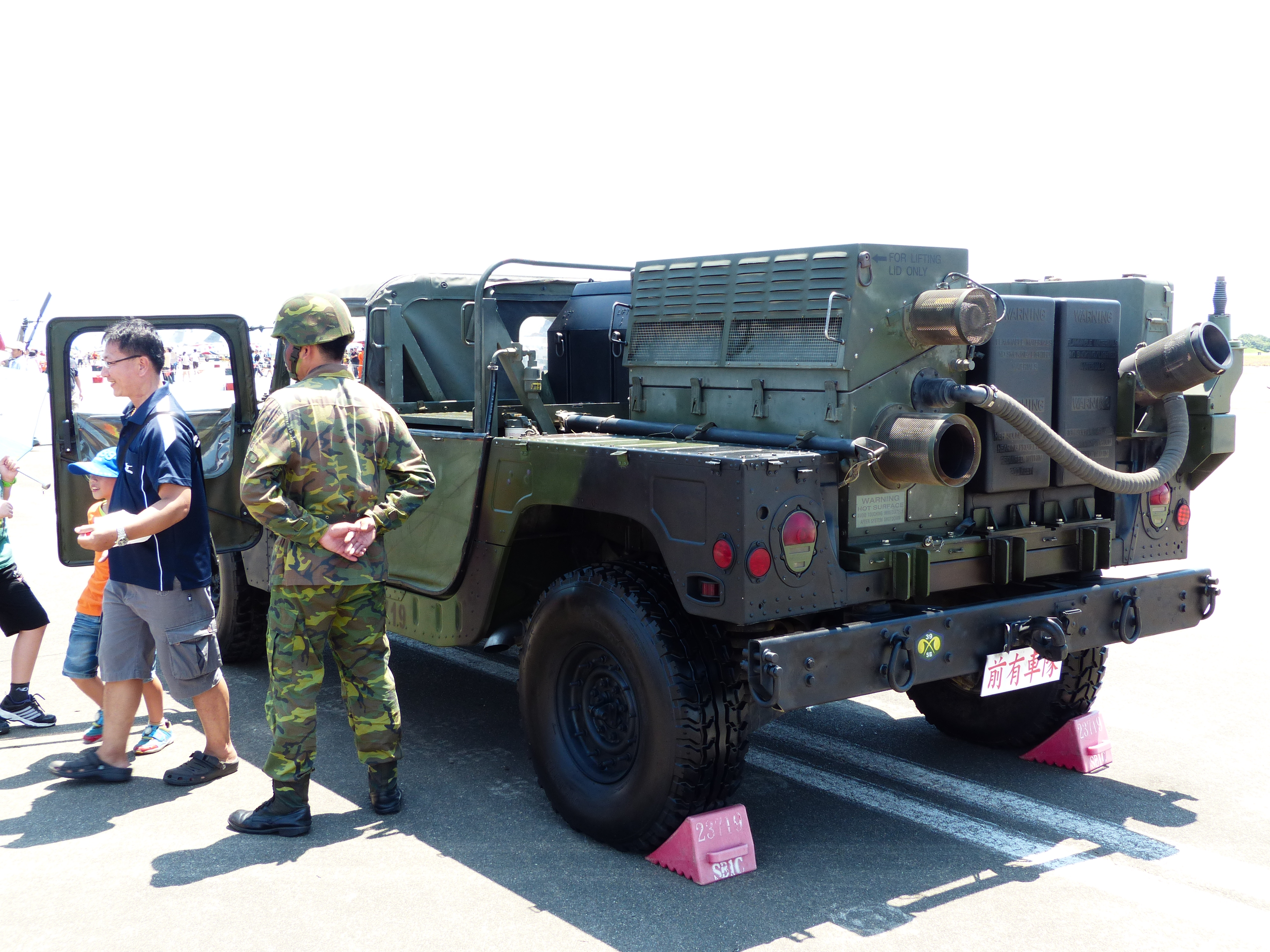
- Type: 2 door truck: Unarmored: Light utility vehicle; Armored: Light armored car
- Place of origin: United States

Service history
- In service: 1997+
- Used by: United States Army

Production history
- Designer: Robotic Systems Technology
- Designed: ~ 1994
- Manufacturer: AM General
- Unit cost: $220,000 (2011) (up-armored) (equivalent to $294,079 in 2023)
- Produced: ~1996+
- No. built: 26 known units produced production order: 267 units

Specifications
- Mass: +11,500 pounds (5,200 kg) M56 +10,500 pounds (4,800 kg) M56A1 gross weight
- Length: 15 ft (4.57 m), wheelbase 10 ft 10 in (3.30 m)
- Width: 7 ft 1 in (2.16 m)
- Height: 6 ft (1.83 m), reducible to 4 ft 6 in (1.37 m)
- Crew: 2 crew operated
- Armor: HT aluminium 8 mm Armour
- Engine: 6.2 L (380 cu in) V8 diesel or 5.7 L gasoline or 6.5 L (400 cu in) V8 turbo diesel and non-turbo diesel: 190 hp (142 kW) @ 3,400 rpm / 380 lb·ft (515 N·m) @ 1,700 rpm
- Transmission: 3-speed automatic or 4-speed automatic
- Suspension: Independent 4×4
- Fuel capacity: 25 U.S. gal (95 L)
- Maximum speed: 55 mph (89 km/h) at max gross weight Over 70 mph (113 km/h) top speed

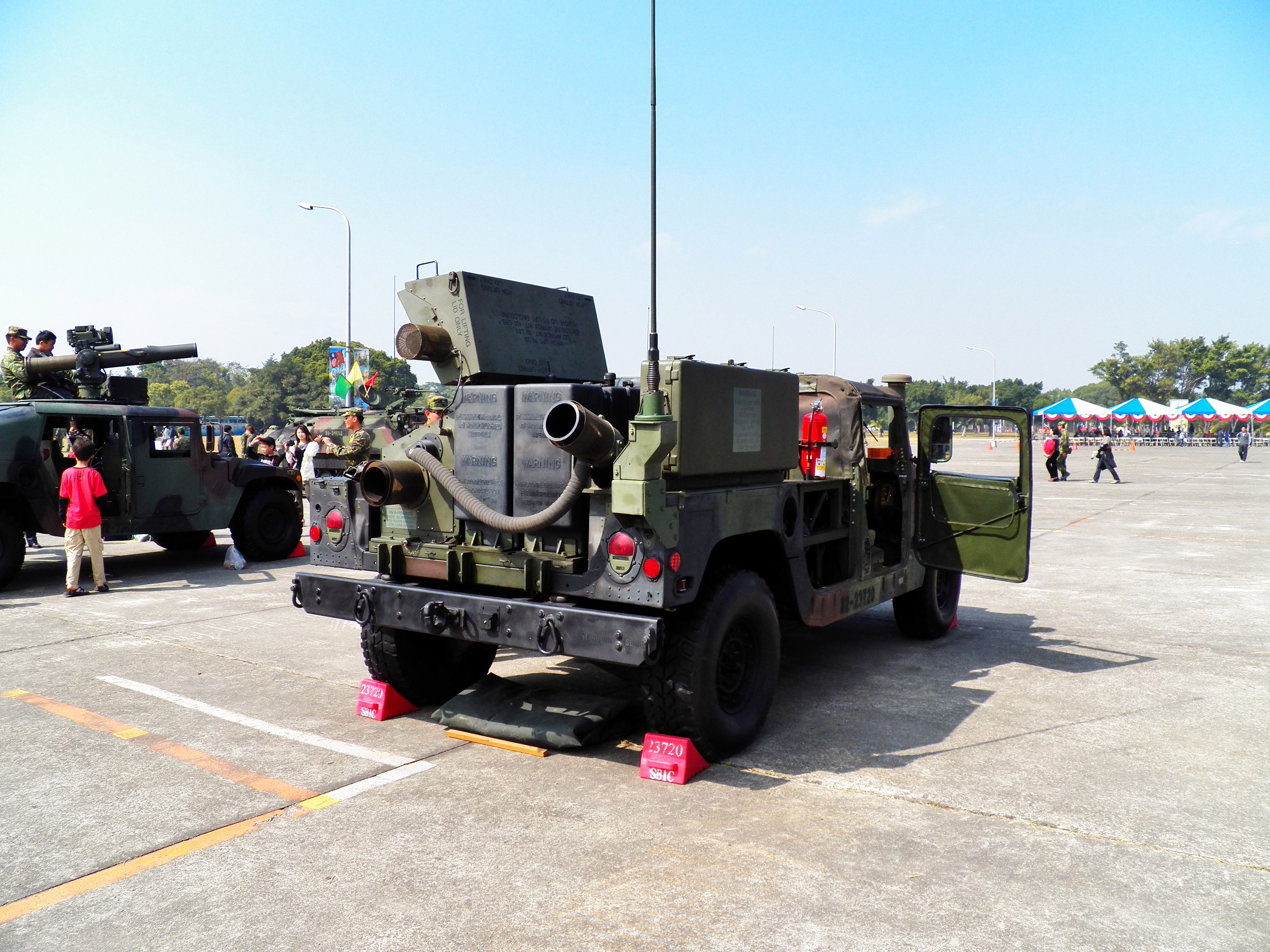
M56 Coyote on the back of a M1113 HMMWV

The M56 Coyote is both a separate technology and a variant of the High Mobility Multipurpose Wheeled Vehicle (HMMWV). It is used to create smoke on a battlefield.

== Description ==
The M56, also known as the Coyote, was a motorized system mounted on an M1113 Expanded Capacity High Mobility Multipurpose Wheeled Vehicle (HMMWV). The M1113 ECV HMMWV had a gross vehicle weight of 11,500 pounds. Its system generates smoke for use in tactical situations on the battlefield to prevent visual or infrared enemy surveillance.

== Use ==
Six M56 Coyotes formed the smoke platoon and the M56 would operate in support of light and airborne maneuver units by disseminating smoke on the move and/or from stationary positions to defeat enemy sensors and smart munitions such as tank thermal sights, guided munitions, directed energy weapons, and other systems operating in the visual through far-infrared regions of the electromagnetic spectrum.

Its smoke generating system provided 90 minutes of visual and 30 minutes of infrared obscuration without resupply. The visual and infrared screens could nullify enemy reconnaissance, surveillance, and target acquisition (RISTA) devices information of troop strength, position, and movement and deny visual and infrared weapon systems kills on friendly combat units. A crew of 2 was required to operate the M56 Coyote.

== Production ==
The M56 Coyote was Type Classified in September 1994. A production contract was awarded to Robotic Systems Technology in March 1995 for 267 systems. First Article and Production Verification testing were successfully completed in September 1996. Eight M56 Coyotes were fielded to the Chemical School at Fort. McClellan, Alabama in May 1997.

Fieldings to FORSCOM began in July 1998 with delivery of 18 systems to the 82nd Airborne Division at Fort Bragg, North Carolina. A follow-on 5-year multiyear contract would be awarded in FY01. A material change program to add a millimetre wave module would also begin in FY01. That program was intended to provide extended spectral coverage to defeat threat weapon systems operating in the millimetre regions of the electromagnetic spectrum. A Drivers Vision Enhancer (DVE) was also to be developed to provide the additional capability to drive at night and under obscured conditions.

== See also ==
- M58 Wolf
