= Magnesium/Teflon/Viton =

Pyrolant commonly used in decoy flares

Magnesium/Teflon/Viton (MTV) is a pyrolant. Teflon and Viton are trademarks of DuPont for polytetrafluoroethylene, (C_{2}F_{4})_{n}, and fluoroelastomer, (CH_{2}CF_{2})_{n}(CF(CF_{3})CF_{2})_{n}. Thermites based on magnesium/Teflon/Viton, aka MTV-compositions, have been in use since the 1950s as payloads in infrared decoy flare applications. Derived from the acronym MTV is the expression "MTV-Flare" for pyrotechnic infrared decoy flares.

== Chemistry ==
Whereas in conventional visual pyrotechnic illuminants sodium nitrate, NaNO_{3}, is used as an oxidizer, in MTV compositions the polytetrafluoroethylene, (C_{2}F_{4})_{n}, acts as fluorine source. The very high reaction enthalpy, $\Delta_\mathrm{R}H$, upon combustion of magnesium with PTFE is based on the formation of magnesium fluoride, having a very high negative enthalpy of formation ( $\Delta_\mathrm{f}H^o$ = −1124 kJ mol^{−1}):

2n Mg + (C_{2}F_{4})_{n} → 2n MgF_{2(s)} + 2n C, $\Delta_\mathrm{R}H$ = −1438 kJ mol^{−1} (1)

As much carbon and heat are released upon combustion of MTV the combustion flame can be described as a grey body of high emissivity.

Depending on stoichiometry, MTV displays varying burn rates and yields different reaction products. With constant Viton-content the burn rate increases exponentially with increasing magnesium content. Nevertheless the burn rate of MTV, as is the case with many metallized pyrotechnic compositions is strongly dependent on the specific surface area of the metal fuel, that are particle morphology and dimensions. Generally magnesium powder having a high specific surface area will exhibit a higher burn rate than those having a smaller specific area. The main reaction products for MTV at Mg contents between 30 and 65 wt% are magnesium fluoride, soot and vaporized magnesium.

For aerial decoy flares magnesium rich compositions are used with Mg contents between 55 and 65 wt%. At these stoichiometries only a part of the applied Mg reacts with the PTFE. The surplus Mg is vaporised and reacts with the atmospheric oxygen; likewise the thermally excited soot reacts with the atmospheric oxygen:

m Mg + (C_{2}F_{4})_{n} → 2n MgF_{2(s)} + (m − 2n) Mg_{(g)} + 2n C, m ≥ 2n (2)

(m − 2n) Mg_{(g)} + 2n C + ((1/2)m + n) O_{2(g)} → (m − 2n) MgO_{(s)} + 2n CO_{2(g)} (3)

== Safety ==
Pyrotechnic compositions based on magnesium/polytetrafluoroethylene with stoichiometries from 25 wt% to 90 wt% magnesium are, according to German explosive legislation, the Koenen test (steel sleeve test), and BAM impact test, explosive substances. Due to their sensitivity and their reaction behaviour these substances are categorized as group 1.1.2. MTV compositions explode at minimum confinement (also self confinement) at relative low amounts. MTV compositions are sensitive toward thermal ignition. In addition MTV compositions in loose and pressed state are extraordinarily sensitive to friction and electrostatic discharges (ESD). Hence, suitable measures have to be taken to avoid ESD while processing and handling of MTV.

== Aerial decoy flare applications ==
Since aircraft and helicopters could (and still can) counter surface-to-air and air-to-air missiles with the substance, MTV was a classified issue until the mid-1980s. It was not until 1997 that the U.S. government released a formerly classified invention, U.S. patent 5,679,921 (filing year 1957), that originally described the properties and applications of MTV.

Although missile development has improved seeker countermeasures against MTV flares there are still numerous missile systems fielded worldwide based on 1st generation technology. Hence MTV flares are still not obsolete in fighting unknown threats. Together with advanced spectral flares (see Flare (countermeasure)) they are part of the so-called "cocktail solution".

== Literature ==
E.-C. Koch, Metal-Fluorocarbon Based Energetic Materials, Wiley-VCH, 2012, 360 pages
