= Polybutadiene acrylonitrile =

Solid rocket motor fuel copolymer

Identifiers
CAS Number	106974-60-1; 9003-18-3
ChemSpider	136656
EC Number	618-357-1
PubChem CID	168343
CompTox Dashboard (EPA)	DTXSID30895082
- Except where otherwise noted, data are given for materials in their standard state (at 25 °C [77 °F], 100 kPa). Infobox references

Polybutadiene acrylonitrile (PBAN) copolymer, also noted as polybutadiene—acrylic acid—acrylonitrile terpolymer is a copolymer compound used most frequently as a rocket propellant fuel mixed with ammonium perchlorate oxidizer. It was the binder formulation widely used on the 1960s–1970s big boosters (e.g., Titan III and Space Shuttle SRBs). It is also notably used in NASA's Space Launch System, likely reusing the design from its Space Shuttle counterpart.

Polybutadiene acrylonitrile is also sometimes used by amateurs due to simplicity, very low cost, and lower toxicity than the more common hydroxyl-terminated polybutadiene (HTPB). HTPB uses isocyanates for curing, which have a relatively quick curing time; however, they are also generally toxic. PBAN based composite propellants also have a slightly higher performance than HTPB based propellants. PBAN is normally cured with the addition of an epoxy resin, taking several days at elevated temperatures to cure.

== Usages ==
PBAN was to be used in the Constellation program, later canceled, as this copolymer was to be used in the first stage of the Ares I rocket in five segments. However future versions of Ares I were discussed using liquid propellants as a potential alternative. PBAN is currently used in the solid rocket boosters on the SLS rocket.
