= Pyrotechnic heat source =

Pyrotechnic device

A pyrotechnic heat source, also called heat pellet, is a pyrotechnic device based on a pyrotechnic composition with a suitable igniter. Its role is to produce controlled amount of heat. Pyrotechnic heat sources are usually based on thermite-like (or sometimes delay composition-like) fuel-oxidizer compositions with slow burn rate, high production of heat at desired temperature, and low to zero production of gases.

Pyrotechnic heat sources can be activated by multiple means. Electric match and percussion cap are the most common ones.

Pyrotechnic heat sources are often used for activation of thermal batteries, where they serve to melt the electrolyte. There are two main types of design. One uses a fuze strip (containing barium chromate and powdered zirconium metal in a ceramic paper) along the edge of the heat pellets to initiate burning. The fuze strip is typically fired by an electrical igniter or squib by application of electric current. The second design uses a center hole in the battery stack into which the high-energy electrical igniter fires a mixture of hot gases and incandescent particles. The center-hole design allows much faster activation times (tens of milliseconds) vs. hundreds of milliseconds for the edge-strip design. Battery activation can also be accomplished by a percussion primer, similar to a shotgun shell. It is desired that the pyrotechnic source be gasless. The standard heat source typically consist of mixtures of iron powder and potassium perchlorate in weight ratios of typically 88/12, 86/14, and 84/16. The higher the potassium perchlorate level, the higher the heat output (nominally 200, 259, and 297 calories/gram, respectively). The size and thickness of the iron-perchlorate pellets has little influence on their burn rate, however the effect of density, composition, and particle size have significant effect on the burn rate and can be used for its adjusting for desired heat output profile. Another composition in use is zirconium with barium chromate. Another mixture is 46.67 wt.% of titanium, 23.33% of amorphous boron, and about 30% barium chromate. Yet another one is 45 wt.% tungsten, 40.5% barium chromate, 14.5% potassium perchlorate, and 1% vinyl alcohol acetate resin binder.

Reactions producing intermetallic components, e.g. zirconium with boron, can be used when entirely gasless operation, non-hygroscopic behavior, and independence on environmental pressure are desired.

Heat paper can be prepared by impregnating paper or a fiberglass tape with a slurry of the mixture of fuel and oxidizer.

A pyrotechnic heat source can be a direct part of a pyrotechnic composition e.g. in chemical oxygen generators a heat source composition with large surplus of oxidizer is used; the heat produced by burning the composition is used for thermal decomposition of the oxidizer. Relatively cold-burning compositions are used for production of colored smoke or for dispersion of aerosol of e.g. pesticides or CS gas, providing the heat of sublimation of the desired compound.

A phase moderating component of the composition, which forms together with the combustion products a mixture with at least one distinct temperature of phase transition, may be used for stabilizing the burning temperature as a form of phase-change material.
