= Reactive multi-layer foil =

Pyrotechnic intermetallic laminated foil

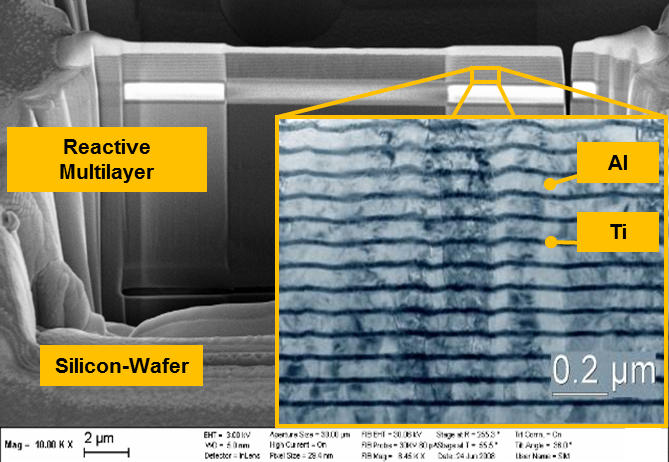
Reactive multi-layer foil

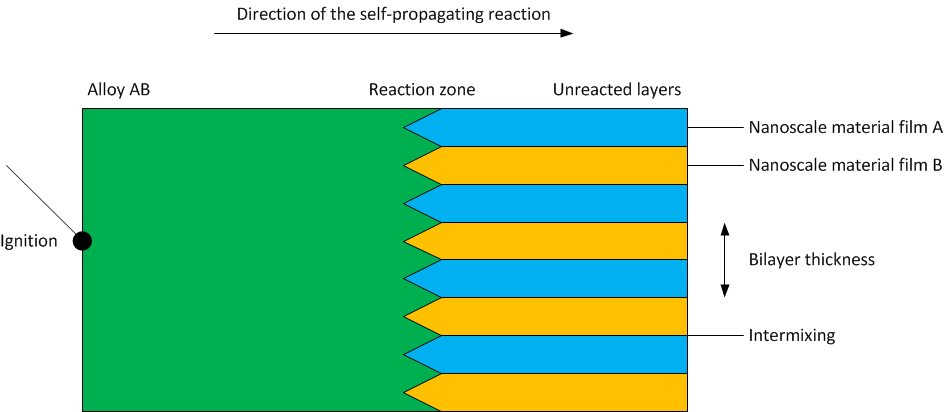

Reactive multi-layer foils are a class of reactive materials, sometimes referred to as a pyrotechnic initiator of two mutually reactive metals, sputtered to form thin layers that create a laminated foil. On initiation by a heat pulse, delivered by a bridge wire, a laser pulse, an electric spark, a flame, or by other means, the metals undergo self-sustaining exothermic reaction, producing an intermetallic compound. The reaction occurs in solid and liquid phase only, without releasing any gas.

One particular type of such materials is aluminum-nickel multilayered foil, that produces (NiAl). Other similar materials are composed of aluminium-titanium, or titanium-amorphous silicon, are used for joining materials by reactive bonding. Other similar intermetallic compositions used in pyrotechnics are titanium-boron and aluminium-palladium ("Pyrofuze").

These foils are made in a range of thicknesses, e.g. 60, 80, 100, and 150 micrometers. The flame front propagation rate ranges generally between 7.5–9 m/s. The reaction temperature can reach up to 1500 °C for a millisecond. The energy released is approximately 1200 to 1300 joules per gram. The velocity and temperature of the reaction can be controlled by adjusting the thickness of the layers. Typical thickness is 50 nm per a bilayer. The thin layers maximize the contact between the metal and lower the activation energy for the reaction, normally too high to allow reaction between bulk aluminium and bulk nickel. The layers are deposited by sequential sputtering of alternately nickel and aluminium.

Nickel aluminide will ignite on heating to at least 250 °C in rate of at least 200 °C/min. Slower heating will anneal the material, causing loss of its pyrotechnic properties. For electrical initiation, a momentary contact at 10A/5V is sufficient; for ohmic contact, 120-150 amperes is needed for a 15 micrometer diameter contact, and 250-300 A for a 300 micrometer contact. It can be also ignited by a heat paper. When the flame front reaches the edge of the material, particles of molten metal can be ejected, causing voids in the bond; this can be prevented by simultaneous ignition from more sides, so the flame fronts meet in the middle, confined by the substrates.

The foil can be both cut and ignited by a laser. The pulse width and power determines if the material will be cut or initiated. It is frequently used as a heat source for soldering and brazing. When sandwiched between the components to be joined, either with a foil of solder on each side, using solder precoated components, or using solder-coated foil, it uniformly delivers significant amount of heat energy across the entire area, melting the solder and only locally heating the surface of the substrates, lowering the heat load on the component in comparison with soldering/brazing in a furnace. An externally applied even pressure during reaction and cooling serves to ensure a good homogeneous joint without voids. Significantly dissimilar materials can be bonded without cracking: semiconductors, metals, ceramics, and polymers. The energy is deposited very locally, without significant heating of the bulk of the substrates, which reduces problems with mismatched thermal expansion coefficients between the materials and allows their joining at room temperature.

== Uses ==
The bonding process can be used in assembly of electronics, die attachment to heatsinks where high temperature stability is required (e.g. high-power LEDs or concentrated photovoltaics solar panels, soldering together layers of composite armor plates, bonding of large sputtering targets made of ceramics or refractory metals where normal indium based solders cannot be used, and other applications where a uniform joint over large area has to be created.

The foil can be used as a pyrotechnic heat source, a replacement of potassium chlorate/iron pellets, for thermal batteries. It reacts faster than the conventional composition, reaches higher temperatures, and heat buffers of inert metal (e.g. steel) are needed to lower the peak temperature and prolong the heat delivery. They can be also used as an electrically initiated pyrotechnic initiator, e.g. to ignite solid propellants, and in decoy flares. They can be employed in weapons as reactive materials, enhancing the energy delivery to the targets by the projectiles or their fragments.

== See also ==
- Reactive material
- Nanothermite
