= Balco =

Balco may refer to:

- Bay Area Laboratory Co-operative (BALCO), a controversial sports medicine/nutrition centre in Burlingame, California
  - BALCO scandal
- Balco alloy, used as a probe in resistance temperature detectors
- Bharat Aluminium Company, an Indian aluminium company
