= Pyrogen =

Pyrogen may refer to:

- Pyrogen (fever), a fever inducing substance.
- Pyrogen (pyrotechnics), a pyrotechnic composition producing flame when heated by e.g. a bridgewire
