= ZRH =

ZRH or ZrH may refer to:

- Zurich Airport, in Switzerland, IATA code ZRH
- Zirconium hydride, chemical symbol ZrH
