= Kanthal =

Kanthal may refer to:

- the historical name of Pratapgarh State, a princely state in India, until it was renamed after its capital Prtabgarh in 1698
- Kanthal (alloy), an industrial material
