= Bridgewire =

Wire used to set off pyrotechnics

A bridgewire or bridge wire, also known as a hot bridge wire (HBW), is a relatively thin resistance wire used to set off a pyrotechnic composition serving as pyrotechnic initiator. By passing of electric current it is heated to a high temperature that starts the exothermic chemical reaction of the attached composition. After successful firing, the bridgewire melts, resulting in an open circuit.

Usually a thin nichrome wire is used. Some applications also use platinum-silver alloy; other bridgewire materials in use are platinum, gold, silver, tungsten, etc. Care has to be taken when selecting the material as it is in direct contact with the pyrotechnic composition and should not undergo corrosion in such conditions. Another material, able to actively release chemical energy, is Pyrofuze, aluminium wire clad with palladium; when being heated it undergoes strongly exothermic reaction as the molten metals form an alloy. A variant with the same function consists of laminated thin alternate layers of aluminium and nickel. Carbon bridge is a thin spot of colloidal graphite used as the bridgewire. Some variants use a conductive pyrotechnic composition as the resistive material. In amateur rocketry, grossly overloaded low wattage metal film resistors and 0805 Surface-mount technology resistors are also used.

A shallow notch cut into the center of the bridgewire promotes gross localized overheating instead of homogeneous heating of the entire bridgewire. This may improve the bridgewire performance in some applications.

Bridgewires are used in diverse applications; to trigger detonators, electric matches, squibs, electric blasting caps, pyrotechnic fasteners, and more. Bridgewires dipped in a suitable pyrotechnic composition (pyrogen) are known as electric matches. Pyrogens with content of magnesium allow reaching very high combustion temperatures.

Devices using bridgewires, whether for initiating an explosion ("electroexplosive") or for nonexplosive purposes, are called bridge wire actuated devices (BWAD).

Bridgewires, especially connected to longer cables, may be susceptible to initiation by currents induced by external electromagnetic fields.

By passing an extremely high amount of electric current through the bridgewire, it gets rapidly vaporized, causing a small explosion. This is exploited in exploding-bridgewire detonators (EBWs), used for very safe and highly precise initiation of explosives, e.g. in nuclear weapons.
