= HDRM =

HDRM may refer to:

- Heart of Dixie Railroad Museum, Alabama
- High-density reactive materials
