= Reactive material =

In the U.S. military, reactive materials (RM) are a new class of materials currently being investigated by the Office of Naval Research and others as a means to increase the lethality of direct-hit or fragmentation warheads. Reactive materials are similar to insensitive high explosives, but are usually thermite-like pyrotechnic compositions of two or more nonexplosive solid materials, which stay inert and do not react with each other until subjected to a sufficiently strong mechanical, electrical or laser stimulus, after which they undergo fast burning or explosion with release of high amount of chemical energy in addition to their kinetic energy. Fragments or projectiles made of such materials have therefore greater damaging effect than inert ones, with expected lethality increase up to 500%.

The material classes under investigation are thermites, intermetallic compounds, metal-polymer mixtures (e.g., magnesium/teflon/viton-like), metastable intermolecular composites (MIC), matrix materials, and hydrides. These materials must be strong enough to act as structural components, be sufficiently stable to survive handling and launch, to penetrate a target, and sufficiently unstable to reliably ignite on impact.

The mixtures under investigation include one or more finely powdered (down to nanoparticle size) metalloids or metals like aluminium, magnesium, zirconium, titanium, tungsten, tantalum, uranium or hafnium, with one or more oxidizers like teflon or other fluoropolymer, pressed or sintered or bonded by other method to a compact, high-density mass. To achieve a suitable reaction rate and insensitivity to impact, friction, and electrostatic discharge, fuel particles have sizes usually between 1-250 μm. A standard composition is aluminium-teflon (Al-PTFE).

Metals which can form intermetallic compounds by an exothermic reaction are another class of candidate materials. An example is a laminate of thin alternating layers of aluminum and nickel, commercially available as NanoFoil.

The RM weapons under development include an active protection system defensive grenade for intercepting incoming missiles or grenades and detonating them at a safe distance, and the BattleAxe warhead that covers a wide area with RM fragments with devastating results to soft targets, while the unexploded fragments left behind have very low lethality versus conventional cluster bomb remains.

Under research are materials with high mechanical strength, high density, high energy density, and which can rapidly convert from a consolidated structural material to fine powder with large surface area, be dispersed and then ignited to produce a large thermobaric blast.

A palladium-clad aluminum wire, known under trademark Pyrofuze, is used as a pyrotechnic initiator.

Reactive materials also have non-weapon uses. Thin layers of reactive materials, clad with a solder, are used for reactive bonding, e.g., in electronics, or for brazing, such as in composite armor plates.
