= Electric match =

Device using electricity to ignite a combustible compound

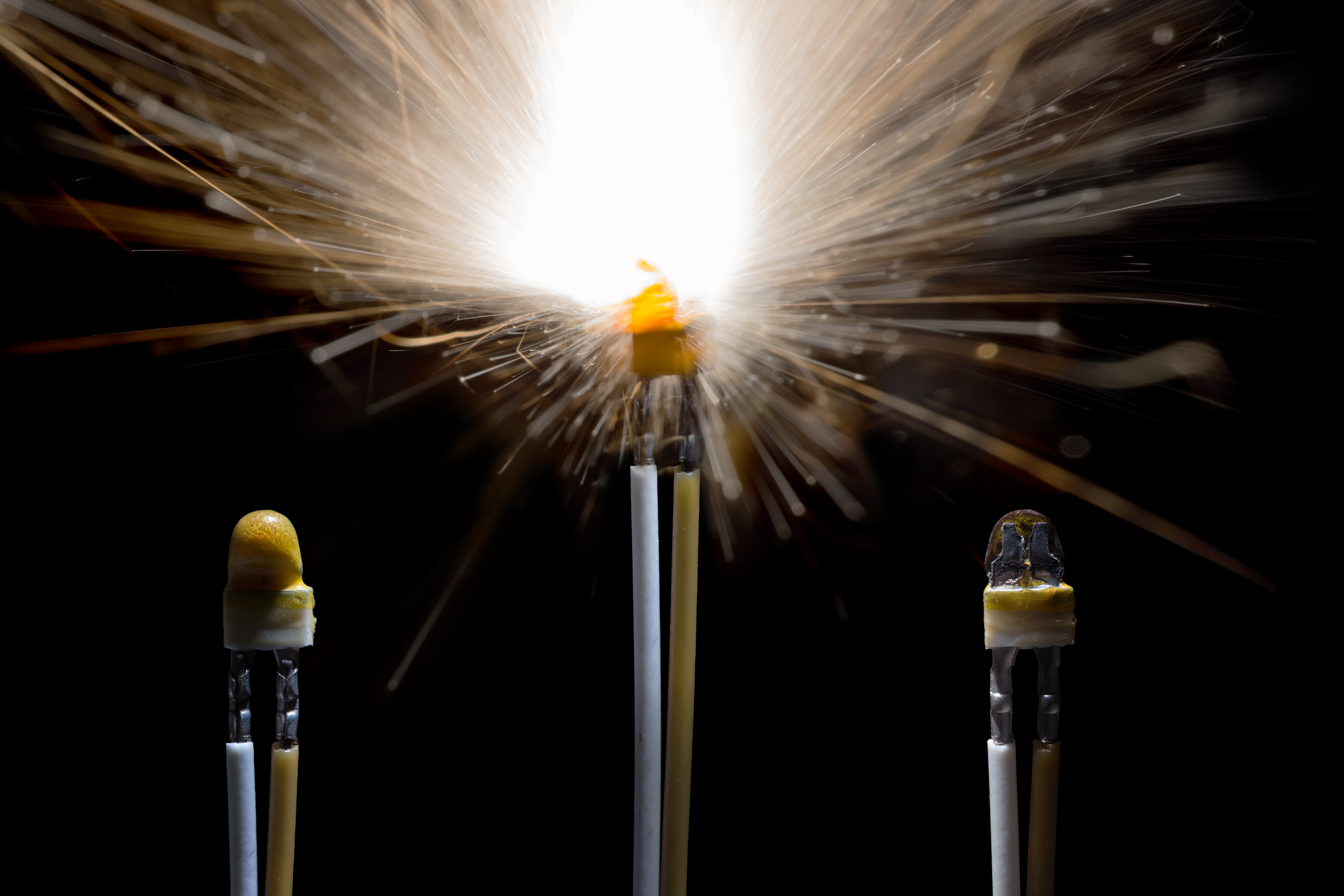
Electric matches before, during and after ignition

An electric match is a device that uses an externally applied electric current to ignite a combustible compound.

Electric matches use a bridgewire consisting of a heating element to ignite a pyrogen, which is a quantity of readily ignited pyrotechnic initiator composition.

Electric matches can be used in any application where source of heat is needed at a precisely controlled point in time, typically to ignite a propellant or explosive. Examples include airbags, pyrotechnics, and military or commercial explosives.

== Design ==
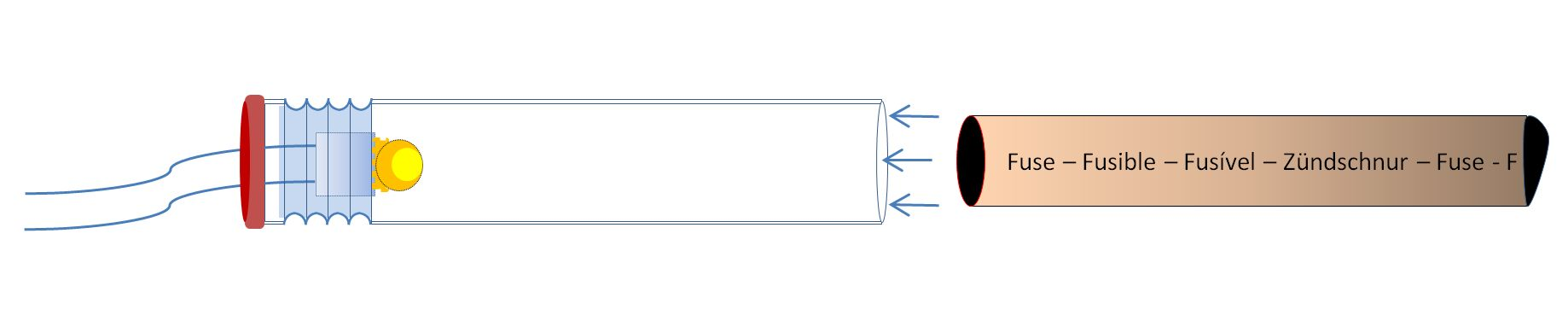
Schematics of an electrical igniter connecting to a fuse

Electric matches consist of two parts, a bridgewire and a pyrogen. The bridgewire is a heating element, typically in the form of a loop or coil of thin wire, which is encased in the pyrogen, which is a quantity of readily ignited pyrotechnic initiator composition. If the pyrogen is sufficiently conductive, it can act as the bridgewire as well. Electric matches also come with provisions for attaching an electric current source, and they may be provided with a protective cover and/or a means to attach them to the device to be ignited.

To operate an electric match, a source of electricity of appropriate voltage and current is needed to provide current to the match. When sufficient electric current is passed through the bridgewire, the resistive heating causes the element to rise above the ignition temperature of the pyrogen, and the pyrogen begins to burn.

Commercial electric match manufacturers often specify 3 key parameters of an electric match: the resistance (often around 2 Ω), a recommended firing current (often around 1 A), and a maximum no-fire current. The "test" button on a firing system typically tests the system by sending a current limited to well below the no-fire current (often 200 mA), to allow for detection of common problems such as short circuits and disconnected open circuits.

== Applications ==
Typical applications include:

- Airbag deployment
- Pyrotechnics
- Military or commercial explosives
- Model rocketry
- Fireplaces: natural gas, propane
- Gas stoves and barbecues

Electric matches, or electronic ignitions, are used in natural gas and propane fueled commercial and household appliances and amenities. Some examples are gas stoves and barbecues, interior and swimming pool hot water heaters and boilers, fireplaces and garden fire pits, and clothes dryers and central heating systems.

Electric matches may be subject to regulations, as they can be used to ignite explosives. For amateur pyrotechnic use, electric matches can be built from scratch or from a kit. Kits include the thin wire needed for the bridgewire, such as nichrome wire, along with components for mixing the pyrogen. Scratch-built matches use thin wire which may be purchased or salvaged from sources such as light bulb filaments, and copper wiring.

In addition to the readily-ignitable component of the electric match pyrogen, some matches may also add additional components to provide a hotter, longer-lasting flame for use on items that are difficult to ignite. For example, igniters for solid fuel model rocket motors often include powdered metals, which provide more heat and duration to the match flame, for a more reliable ignition of the motor.

== See also ==
- Tubes and primers for ammunition
- Primers
- Blasting cap
- Micro combined heat and power
- Renewable natural gas
- Squib (explosive)
- Pyrotechnic fastener
- Exploding-bridgewire detonator
