= Nichrome =

Family of alloys of mainly nickel and chromium

Nichrome (also known as NiCr, nickel-chromium or chromium-nickel) is a family of alloys of nickel and chromium (and occasionally iron) commonly used as resistance wire, heating elements in devices like toasters, electrical kettles and space heaters, in some dental restorations (fillings) and in a few other applications.

Patented in 1906 by Albert Marsh (US patent 811,859), nichrome is the oldest documented form of resistance heating alloy.

The A grade nichrome alloy is 80% nickel and 20% chromium by mass, but there are many other combinations of metals for various applications.

== Properties ==
C grade nichrome is consistently silvery in color, is corrosion-resistant, has a high melting point of approximately 1,400 °C (2,550 °F), and has an electrical resistivity of around 1.12 μΩ·m, which is around 66 times the resistivity of copper of 16.78 nΩ·m. Some nichrome formulations have a resistivity as low as 1.0 μΩ·m or as high as 1.5 μΩ·m.

Almost any conductive wire can be used for heating, but most metals conduct electricity with great efficiency, requiring them to be formed into very thin and delicate wires to create enough resistance to generate heat. When heated in air, most metals then oxidize quickly, become brittle and break. Nichrome wire, when heated to red-hot temperatures, develops an outer layer of chromium oxide, which is thermodynamically stable in air, is mostly impervious to oxygen, and protects the heating element from further oxidation.

Nichrome alloys are known for their high mechanical strength and their high creep strength. The properties of nichrome vary depending on its alloy. Figures given are representative of typical material and are accurate to expressed significant figures. Any variations are due to different percentages of nickel or chromium.

=== Standard compositions ===
Nichrome alloys for use in resistance heating are described by both ASTM and DIN standards. These standards specify the relative percentages of nickel and chromium that should be present in an alloy. In ASTM three alloys that are specified contain, amongst other trace elements:

- 80% Ni, 20% Cr
- 60% Ni, 16% Cr
- 35% Ni, 20% Cr

=== Properties by composition ===
Each standard composition of nichrome has unique material properties. Some general ones are given as follows:

Table of nichrome alloys
Alloy	% Content			Density [g/cm^{3}]
Alloy	Ni	Cr	Fe	Density [g/cm^{3}]
NiCr 80/20	80	20	-	8.3
NiCr 70/30	70	30	-	8.1
NiCr 60/16	60	16	(24)	8.2
NiCr 35/20	35	20	(45)	7.9

== Uses ==
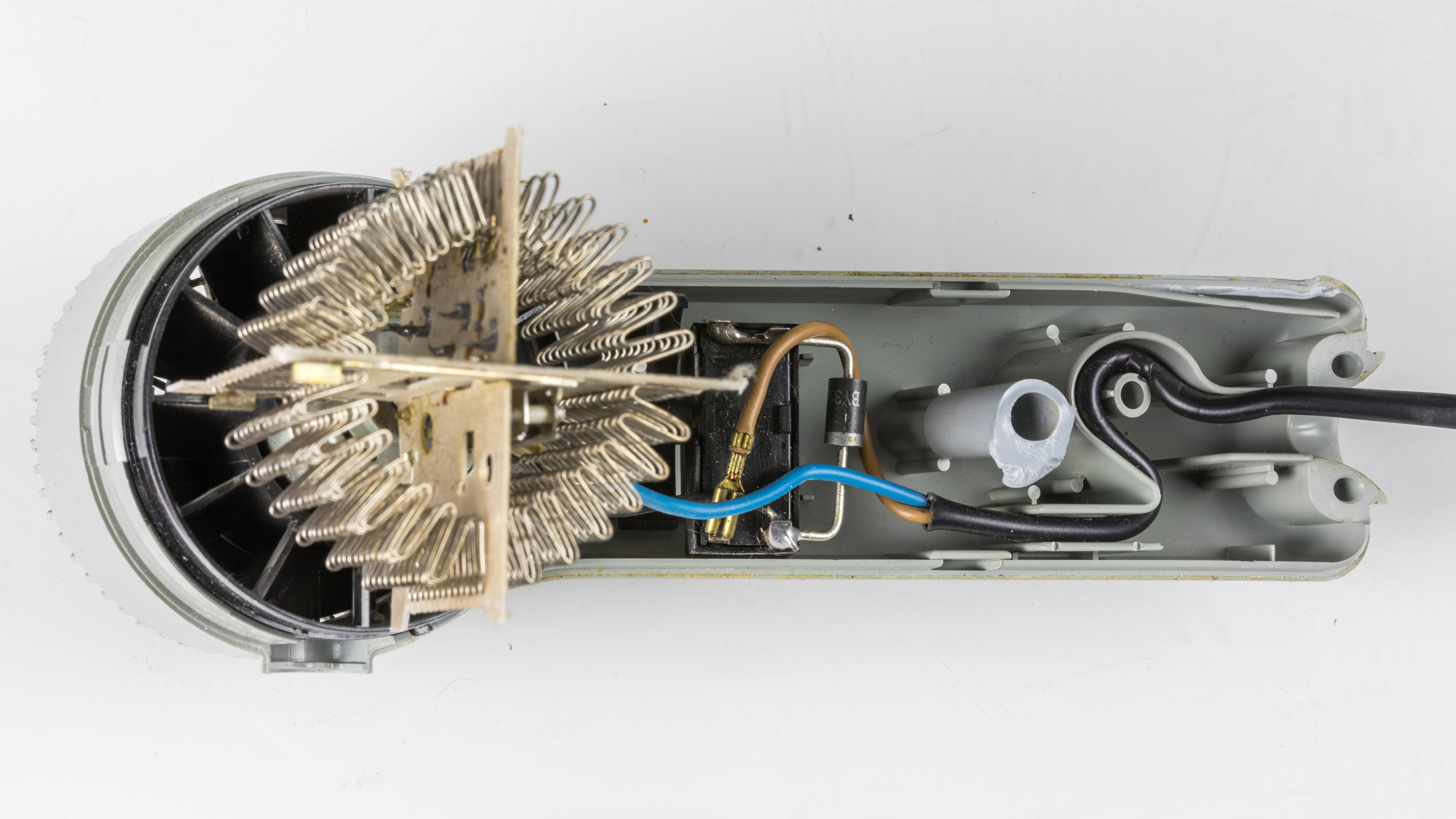
An electrical device using coils of wire for resistive heating (wrapped around sheets of mica)

Because of its low cost of manufacture, strength, ductility, resistance to oxidation, stability at high temperatures, and electrical resistance, nichrome is widely used in electric heating elements in applications such as hair dryers and heat guns. Typically, nichrome is wound in coils to a certain electrical resistance, and when current is passed through it the Joule heating produces heat.

Nichrome is used in the explosives and fireworks industry as a bridgewire in electric ignition systems, such as electric matches and model rocket igniters.

Industrial and hobby hot-wire foam cutters use nichrome wire.

Nichrome wire is commonly used in ceramic as an internal support structure to help some elements of clay sculptures hold their shape while they are still soft. Nichrome wire is used for its ability to withstand the high temperatures that occur when clay work is fired in a kiln.

Nichrome wire can be used as an alternative to platinum wire for flame testing by colouring the non-luminous part of a flame to detect cations such as sodium, potassium, copper, calcium, etc.

Other areas of usage include motorcycle mufflers, in certain areas in the microbiological lab apparatus, as the heating element of plastic extruders by the RepRap 3D printing community, in the solar panel deployment mechanism of spacecraft LightSail-A, and as the heating coils of electronic cigarettes.

The alloy price is controlled by the more expensive nickel content. Distributor pricing is typically indexed to market prices for nickel.

Nickel allergies are common; while the wire in heating elements is rarely directly touched by users of devices, some uses of nichrome are, and a 1984 study by the University of Puerto Rico showed that 28.5% of people tested had some kind of allergic reaction following contact with nickel.

== See also ==
- Chromel
- Constantan
- Hastelloy
- Inconel
- Kanthal
