= Kanthal (alloy) =

Alloy of iron, chromium and aluminium used as resistance and heating wire

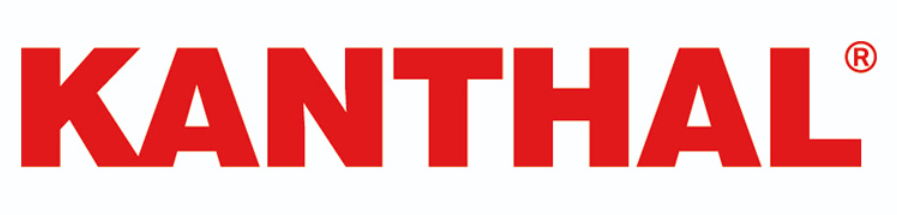

Kanthal is the trademark for a family of iron-chromium-aluminium (FeCrAl) alloys used in a wide range of resistance and high-temperature applications. Kanthal FeCrAl alloys consist of mainly iron, chromium (20–30 wt%) and aluminium (4–7.5 wt%). The first Kanthal FeCrAl alloy was developed by Hans von Kantzow in Hallstahammar, Sweden. The alloys are known for their ability to withstand high temperatures and having intermediate electric resistance. As such, it is frequently used in heating elements. The trademark Kanthal is owned by Alleima AB.

== Characteristics ==
For heating, resistance wire must be stable in air when hot. Kanthal FeCrAl alloy forms a protective layer of aluminium oxide (alumina). Aluminium oxide has high thermal conductivity but is an electrical insulator, so special techniques may be required to make good electrical connections.

Ordinary Kanthal FeCrAl alloy has a melting point of 1,425 °C (2,597 °F). Special grades can be used as high as 1,500 °C (2,730 °F).

Depending on specific composition the resistivity is about 1.4 μΩ·m and temperature coefficient is +49 ppm/K (+49×10^{−6} K^{−1}).

== Uses ==
Kanthal is used in heating elements due to its flexibility, durability and tensile strength. Its uses are widespread, for example in toasters, home and industrial heaters, kilns and diffusion heaters (used to make crystalline silicon).

In comparison to the other types of resistance wire used in vaping such as Nichrome, titanium-alloy and stainless steel, Kanthal is durable enough to withstand the temperatures required, but flexible and cheap enough to be practical for vaping purposes.

== See also ==
- Nichrome
