= Alleima =

Swedish metallurgy company

- Formerly: Sandvik Materials Technology
- Type: Publicly traded aktiebolag
- Traded as: Nasdaq Stockholm: ALLEI
- ISIN: SE0017615644
- Industry: Stainless steel; Advanced alloys
- Founded: 1862 as Sandvik
- Headquarters: Sandviken, Sweden
- Key people: Göran Björkman; CEO
- Revenue: ▼5.038 billion kr (2023)
- Total assets: ▼22.996 billion kr (2023)
- Total equity: ▼15.732 billion kr (2023)
- Number of employees: 6,110 (2023)
- Website: www.alleima.com

Alleima is a Swedish company specialising in advanced alloys for various industrial applications. In 2023, it had operations in 80 countries. Alleima's makes materials and components for many applications, e.g. medical, hydrogen, electrical heating technology, ultra-fine wires, and nuclear power plants.

Alleima researches materials togethers with University of Uppsala.

== IPO ==
Alleima IPO-ed on August 31, 2022, as a spinoff from Sandvik.
