= Pyrotechnic initiator =

Device containing a pyrotechnic composition

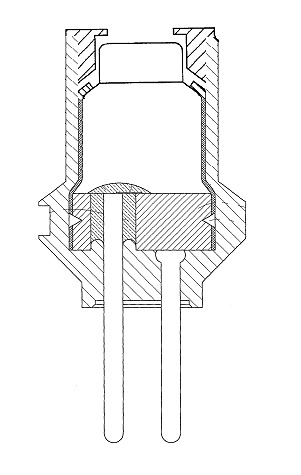
Pyrotechnic initiator scheme

In pyrotechnics, a pyrotechnic initiator (also initiator or igniter) is a device containing a pyrotechnic composition used primarily to ignite other, more difficult-to-ignite materials, such as thermites, gas generators, and solid-fuel rockets. The name is often used also for the compositions themselves.

Pyrotechnic initiators are often controlled electrically (called electro-pyrotechnic initiators), e.g. using a heated bridgewire or a bridge resistor. They are somewhat similar to blasting caps or other detonators, but they differ in that there is no intention to produce a shock wave. An example of such pyrotechnic initiator is an electric match.

== Composition ==
The energetic material used, often called pyrogen, is usually a pyrotechnic composition made of a fuel and oxidizer, where the fuel produces a significant amount of hot particles that cause/promote the ignition of the desired material.

Initiator compositions are similar to flash powders, but they differ in burning speed, as explosion is not intended, and have intentionally high production of hot particles. They also tend to be easier to ignite than thermites, with which they also share similarities.

Common oxidizers used are potassium perchlorate and potassium nitrate. Common fuels used are titanium, titanium(II) hydride, zirconium, zirconium hydride, and boron. The size of the fuel particles is determined to produce hot particles with the required burning time.

More exotic materials can be used, e.g. carboranes.

For special applications, pyrophoric igniters can be used which burst into flame in contact with air. Triethylborane/TEA-TEB was used as an igniter for the Lockheed SR-71 jet engines, the Rocketdyne F-1 engine on the first stage of the Saturn V, NPO Energomash's RD-180 engine used on the first stage of the Atlas V, and SpaceX's Merlin engine used on the first stage of the Falcon 9.

== Common compositions ==
=== Metal-oxidizer ===
==== ZPP ====
One of the most common initiators is ZPP, or zirconium – potassium perchlorate – a mixture of metallic zirconium and potassium perchlorate. This mixture is used in the NASA Standard Initiator, which is used to ignite various pyrotechnic systems, including the NASA standard detonator. It yields rapid pressure rise, generates little gas, emits hot particles when ignited, is thermally stable, has long shelf life, and is stable under vacuum. It is sensitive to static electricity.

==== BPN ====
Another common igniter formula is BPN, BKNO3, or boron – potassium nitrate, a mixture of 25% boron and 75% potassium nitrate by weight. It is used e.g. by NASA. It is thermally stable, stable in vacuum, and its burn rate is independent of pressure.

In comparison with black powder, BPN burns significantly hotter and leaves more of solid residues, therefore black powder is favored for multiple-use systems.

BPN's high temperature makes it suitable for uses where rapid and reproducible initiation is critical, e.g. for airbags, rocket engines, and decoy flares. It is however relatively expensive.

BPN can be also used as an ingredient of solid rocket propellants.

BPN can be ignited by a laser. A semiconductor laser of at least 0.4 watts output can be used for ignition in vacuum.

==== Others ====
Other mixtures encountered are aluminium-potassium perchlorate and titanium-aluminium-potassium perchlorate.

=== Metal hydride-oxidizer ===
Metal hydride-oxidizer mixtures replace the metal with its corresponding hydride. They are generally safer to handle than the corresponding metal-oxidizer compositions. During burning they also release hydrogen, which can act as a secondary fuel. Zirconium hydride, titanium hydride, and boron hydride are commonly used.

==== ZHPP ====
ZHPP (zirconium hydride – potassium perchlorate) is a variant of ZPP that uses zirconium hydride instead of pure zirconium. It is significantly safer to handle than ZPP.

==== THPP ====
THPP (titanium hydride potassium perchlorate) is a mixture of titanium(II) hydride and potassium perchlorate. It is similar to ZHPP. Like ZHPP, it is safer to handle than titanium-potassium perchlorate.

=== Intermetallics ===
Formation of an intermetallic compound can be a strongly exothermic reaction, usable as an initiator.

==== Titanium-boron ====
Titanium-boron composition is one of the hottest pyrotechnic reactions in common usage. It is solid-state, gasless. It can be used as a pyrotechnic initiator or for heating confined gas to perform mechanical work.

==== Nickel-aluminium ====
Nickel-aluminium laminates can be used as electrically initiated pyrotechnic initiators. NanoFoil is such material, commercially available.

==== Palladium-aluminium ====
Palladium-clad aluminium wires can be used as a fuse wire, known as Pyrofuze. The reaction is initiated by heat, typically supplied by electric current pulse. The reaction begins at 600 °C, the melting point of aluminium, and proceeds violently to temperature of 2200–2800 °C. The reaction does not need presence of oxygen, and the wire is consumed.

Pyrofuze comes as a solid wire of different diameters (from 0.002" to 0.02"), braided wire, ribbon, foil, and granules. Palladium, platinum, or palladium alloyed with 5% ruthenium can be used together with aluminium. Pyrofuze bridgewires can be used in squibs and electric matches. Pyrofuze foils can be used for e.g. sealing of various dispensers or fire extinguishing systems. Palladium-magnesium composition can also be used, but is not commercially available or not at least as common.

=== Others ===
==== BNCP ====
BNCP, (cis-bis-(5-nitrotetrazolato)tetraminecobalt(III) perchlorate) is another common initiator material. It is relatively insensitive. It undergoes deflagration to detonation transition in a relatively short distance, allowing its use in detonators. Its burning byproducts are of relatively little harm to environment. It can be ignited by a laser diode.

==== Lead azide ====
Lead azide (Pb(N_{3})_{2}, or PbN_{6}) is occasionally used in pyrotechnic initiators.

==== Others ====
Other materials sensitive to heat can be used as well, e.g. HMTD, tetrazene explosive, lead mononitro-resorcinates, lead dinitro-resorcinates, and lead trinitro-resorcinates.

== See also ==
- Sprengel explosive
