= Joule heating =

Heat from a current in an electric conductor

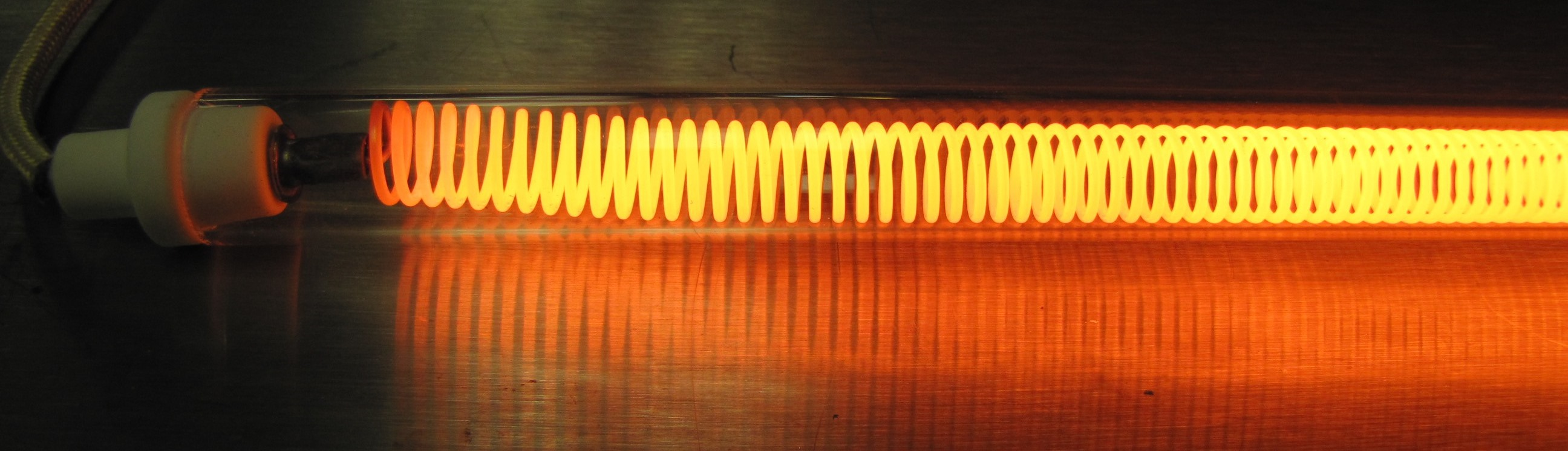
A coiled heating element from an electric toaster, showing red to yellow incandescence

Joule heating (also known as resistive heating, resistance heating, or Ohmic heating) is the process by which the passage of an electric current through a conductor produces heat.

Joule's first law (also just Joule's law), also known in countries of the former USSR as the Joule–Lenz law, states that the power of heating generated by an electrical conductor equals the product of its resistance and the square of the current. Joule heating affects the whole electric conductor, unlike the Peltier effect which transfers heat from one electrical junction to another.

Joule-heating or resistive-heating is used in many devices and industrial processes. The part that converts electricity into heat is called a heating element.

Practical applications of joule heating include, but are not limited to:

- Buildings are often heated with electric heaters where grid power is available.
- Electric stoves and ovens use Joule heating to cook food.
- Soldering irons generate heat to melt conductive solder and make electrical connections.
- Cartridge heaters are used in various manufacturing processes.
- Electric fuses are used as a safety device, breaking a circuit by melting if enough current flows to heat them to the melting point.
- Electronic cigarettes vaporize liquid by Joule heating.
- Food processing equipment may make use of Joule heating: running a current through food material (which behave as an electrical resistor) causes heat release inside the food. The alternating electrical current coupled with the resistance of the food causes the generation of heat. A higher resistance increases the heat generated. Joule heating allows for fast and uniform heating of food products, which maintains quality. Products with particulates heat up faster (compared to conventional heat processing) due to higher resistance.

== History ==
James Prescott Joule first published in December 1840, an abstract in the Proceedings of the Royal Society, suggesting that heat could be generated by an electrical current. Joule immersed a length of wire in a fixed mass of water and measured the temperature rise due to a known current flowing through the wire for a 30 minute period. By varying the current and the length of the wire he deduced that the heat produced was proportional to the square of the current multiplied by the electrical resistance of the immersed wire.

In 1841 and 1842, subsequent experiments showed that the amount of heat generated was proportional to the chemical energy used in the voltaic pile that generated the template. This led Joule to reject the caloric theory (at that time the dominant theory) in favor of the mechanical theory of heat (according to which heat is another form of energy).

Resistive heating was independently studied by Heinrich Lenz in 1842.

The SI unit of energy was subsequently named the joule and given the symbol J. The commonly known unit of power, the watt, is equivalent to one joule per second.

== Microscopic description ==
Joule heating is caused by interactions between charge carriers (usually electrons) and the body of the conductor.

A potential difference (voltage) between two points of a conductor creates an electric field that accelerates charge carriers in the direction of the electric field, giving them kinetic energy. When the charged particles collide with the quasi-particles in the conductor (i.e. the canonically quantized, ionic lattice oscillations in the harmonic approximation of a crystal), energy is being transferred from the electrons to the lattice (by the creation of further lattice oscillations). The oscillations of the ions are the origin of the radiation ("thermal energy") that one measures in a typical experiment.

== Power loss and noise ==
Joule heating is referred to as ohmic heating or resistive heating because of its relationship to Ohm's law. It forms the basis for the large number of practical applications involving electric heating. However, in applications where heating is an unwanted by-product of current use (e.g., load losses in electrical transformers) the diversion of energy is often referred to as resistive loss. The use of high voltages in electric power transmission systems is specifically designed to reduce such losses in cabling by operating with commensurately lower currents. The ring circuits, or ring mains, used in UK homes are another example, where power is delivered to outlets at lower currents (per wire, by using two paths in parallel), thus reducing Joule heating in the wires. Joule heating does not occur in superconducting materials, as these materials have zero electrical resistance in the superconducting state.

Resistors create electrical noise, called Johnson–Nyquist noise. There is an intimate relationship between Johnson–Nyquist noise and Joule heating, explained by the fluctuation-dissipation theorem.

== Formulas ==
=== Direct current ===
The most fundamental formula for Joule heating is the generalized power equation:
$$P = I (V_{A} - V_{B})$$
where

- $P$ is the power (energy per unit time) converted from electrical energy to thermal energy,
- $I$ is the current travelling through the resistor or other element,
- $V_{A}-V_{B}$ is the voltage drop across the element.

The explanation of this formula ($P = IV$) is:

(Energy dissipated per unit time) = (Charge passing through resistor per unit time) × (Energy dissipated per charge passing through resistor)

Assuming the element behaves as a perfect resistor and that the power is completely converted into heat, the formula can be re-written by substituting Ohm's law, $V = I R$, into the generalized power equation:
$$P = IV = I^2R = V^2/R$$
where R is the resistance.

=== Alternating current ===
When current varies, as it does in AC circuits,

$$P(t) = U(t) I(t)$$

where t is time and P is the instantaneous active power being converted from electrical energy to heat. Far more often, the average power is of more interest than the instantaneous power. For an ideal resistor, with zero reactance, the average Joule-heating power is

$$P_{\rm avg} = U_\text{rms} I_\text{rms} = (I_\text{rms})^2 R = (U_\text{rms})^2 / R$$

where "avg" denotes average (mean) over one or more cycles, and "rms" denotes root mean square.

If the reactance is nonzero, the formulas are modified. The average Joule-heating power is

$$P_{\rm avg} = U_\text{rms}I_\text{rms}\cos\phi = (I_\text{rms})^2 \operatorname{Re}(Z) = (U_\text{rms})^2 \operatorname{Re}(Y^*)$$

where $\phi$ is phase difference between current and voltage, $\operatorname{Re}$ means real part, Z is the complex impedance, and Y* is the complex conjugate of the admittance (equal to 1/Z*). Note that $\operatorname{Re}(Z) = R$, and

$$\operatorname{Re}(Y^*) = \operatorname{Re} \frac{1}{Z^*} = \operatorname{Re} \frac{Z}{|Z|^2} = \frac{R}{|Z|^2}.$$

For more details in the reactive case, see AC power.

=== Differential form ===
Joule heating can also be calculated at a particular location in space. The differential form of the Joule heating equation gives the power per unit volume.

$$\frac{\mathrm{d}P}{\mathrm{d}V} = \mathbf{J} \cdot \mathbf{E}$$

Here, $\mathbf{J}$ is the current density, and $\mathbf{E}$ is the electric field. For a material with a conductivity $\sigma$, $\mathbf{J}=\sigma \mathbf{E}$ and therefore
$$\frac{\mathrm{d}P}{\mathrm{d}V} = \mathbf{J} \cdot \mathbf{E} = \mathbf{J} \cdot \mathbf{J}\frac{1}{\sigma} = J^2\rho$$

where $\rho = 1/\sigma$ is the resistivity. This directly resembles the "$I^2R$" term of the macroscopic form.

In the harmonic case, where all field quantities vary with the angular frequency $\omega$ as $e^{-\mathrm{i} \omega t}$, complex valued phasors $\hat\mathbf{J}$ and $\hat\mathbf{E}$ are usually introduced for the current density and the electric field intensity, respectively. The Joule heating then reads
$$\frac{\mathrm{d}P}{\mathrm{d}V} = \frac{1}{2}\hat\mathbf{J} \cdot \hat\mathbf{E}^* = \frac{1}{2}\hat\mathbf{J} \cdot \hat\mathbf{J}^*/\sigma = \frac{1}{2}J^2\rho,$$
where $\bullet^*$ denotes the complex conjugate.

== Electricity transmission ==
Overhead power lines transfer electrical energy from electricity producers to consumers. Those power lines have a nonzero resistance and therefore are subject to Joule heating, which causes transmission losses.

The split of power between transmission losses (Joule heating in transmission lines) and load (useful energy delivered to the consumer) can be approximated by a voltage divider. In order to minimize transmission losses, the resistance of the lines has to be as small as possible compared to the load (resistance of consumer appliances). Line resistance is minimized by the use of copper conductors, but the resistance and power supply specifications of consumer appliances are fixed.

Usually, a transformer is placed between the lines and consumption. When a high-voltage, low-intensity current in the primary circuit (before the transformer) is converted into a low-voltage, high-intensity current in the secondary circuit (after the transformer), the equivalent resistance of the secondary circuit becomes higher and transmission losses are reduced in proportion.

During the war of currents, AC installations could use transformers to reduce line losses by Joule heating, at the cost of higher voltage in the transmission lines, compared to DC installations.

== Applications ==
=== Food processing ===
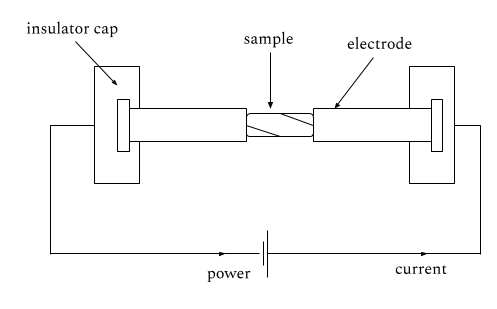
General process for joule heating in food

Joule heating is a flash pasteurization (also called "high-temperature short-time" (HTST)) aseptic process that runs an alternating current of 50–60 Hz through food. Heat is generated through the food's electrical resistance. As the product heats, electrical conductivity increases linearly. A higher electrical current frequency is best as it reduces oxidation and metallic contamination. This heating method is best for foods that contain particulates suspended in a weak salt-containing medium due to their high resistance properties.

Heat is generated rapidly and uniformly in the liquid matrix as well as in particulates, producing a higher quality sterile product that is suitable for aseptic processing.

Electrical energy is linearly translated to thermal energy as electrical conductivity increases, and this is the key process parameter that affects heating uniformity and heating rate. This heating method is best for foods that contain particulates suspended in a weak salt containing medium due to their high resistance properties. Ohmic heating is beneficial due to its ability to inactivate microorganisms through thermal and non-thermal cellular damage.

This method can also inactivate antinutritional factors thereby maintaining nutritional and sensory properties. However, ohmic heating is limited by viscosity, electrical conductivity, and fouling deposits. Although ohmic heating has not yet been approved by the Food and Drug Administration (FDA) for commercial use, this method has many potential applications, ranging from cooking to fermentation.

There are different configurations for continuous ohmic heating systems, but in the most basic process, a power supply or generator is needed to produce electrical current. Electrodes, in direct contact with food, pass electric current through the matrix. The distance between the electrodes can be adjusted to achieve the optimum electrical field strength.

The generator creates the electrical current which flows to the first electrode and passes through the food product placed in the electrode gap. The food product resists the flow of current causing internal heating. The current continues to flow to the second electrode and back to the power source to close the circuit. The insulator caps around the electrodes controls the environment within the system.

The electrical field strength and the residence time are the key process parameters which affect heat generation.

The ideal foods for ohmic heating are viscous with particulates.

- Thick soups
- Sauces
- Stews
- Salsa
- Fruit in a syrup medium
- Milk
- Ice cream mix
- Egg
- Whey
- Heat sensitive liquids
- Soymilk

The efficiency by which electricity is converted to heat depends upon on salt, water, and fat content due to their thermal conductivity and resistance factors. In particulate foods, the particles heat up faster than the liquid matrix due to higher resistance to electricity and matching conductivity can contribute to uniform heating. This prevents overheating of the liquid matrix while particles receive sufficient heat processing. Table 1 shows the electrical conductivity values of certain foods to display the effect of composition and salt concentration. The high electrical conductivity values represent a larger number of ionic compounds suspended in the product, which is directly proportional to the rate of heating. This value is increased in the presence of polar compounds, like acids and salts, but decreased with nonpolar compounds, like fats. Electrical conductivity of food materials generally increases with temperature, and can change if there are structural changes caused during heating such as gelatinization of starch. Density, pH, and specific heat of various components in a food matrix can also influence heating rate.

Table 1. Electrical conductivity of selected foods
Food	Electrical Conductivity (S/m)	Temperature (°C)
Apple Juice	0.239	20
Beef	0.42	19
Beer	0.143	22
Carrot	0.041	19
Carrot Juice	1.147	22
Chicken meat	0.19	20
Coffee (black)	0.182	22
Coffee (black with sugar)	0.185	22
Coffee (with milk)	0.357	22
Starch solution (5.5%)		
(a) with 0.2% salt	0.34	19
(b) with 0.55% salt	1.3	19
(c) with 2% salt	4.3	19

Benefits of Ohmic heating include: uniform and rapid heating (>1°Cs^{−1}), less cooking time, better energy efficiency, lower capital cost, and heating simultaneously throughout food's volume as compared to aseptic processing, canning, and PEF. Volumetric heating allows internal heating instead of transferring heat from a secondary medium. This results in the production of safe, high quality food with minimal changes to structural, nutritional, and organoleptic properties of food. Heat transfer is uniform to reach areas of food that are harder to heat. Less fouling accumulates on the electrodes as compared to other heating methods. Ohmic heating also requires less cleaning and maintenance, resulting in an environmentally cautious heating method.

Microbial inactivation in ohmic heating is achieved by both thermal and non-thermal cellular damage from the electrical field. This method destroys microorganisms due to electroporation of cell membranes, physical membrane rupture, and cell lysis. In electroporation, excessive leakage of ions and intramolecular components results in cell death. In membrane rupture, cells swell due to an increase in moisture diffusion across the cell membrane. Pronounced disruption and decomposition of cell walls and cytoplasmic membranes causes cells to lyse.

Decreased processing times in ohmic heating maintains nutritional and sensory properties of foods. Ohmic heating inactivates antinutritional factors like lipoxigenase (LOX), polyphenoloxidase (PPO), and pectinase due to the removal of active metallic groups in enzymes by the electrical field. Similar to other heating methods, ohmic heating causes gelatinization of starches, melting of fats, and protein agglutination. Water-soluble nutrients are maintained in the suspension liquid allowing for no loss of nutritional value if the liquid is consumed.

Ohmic heating is limited by viscosity, electrical conductivity, and fouling deposits. The density of particles within the suspension liquid can limit the degree of processing. A higher viscosity fluid will provide more resistance to heating, allowing the mixture to heat up quicker than low viscosity products. A food product's electrical conductivity is a function of temperature, frequency, and product composition. This may be increased by adding ionic compounds, or decreased by adding non-polar constituents. Changes in electrical conductivity limit ohmic heating as it is difficult to model the thermal process when temperature increases in multi-component foods.

The potential applications of ohmic heating range from cooking, thawing, blanching, peeling, evaporation, extraction, dehydration, and fermentation. These allow for ohmic heating to pasteurize particulate foods for hot filling, pre-heat products prior to canning, and aseptically process ready-to-eat meals and refrigerated foods. Prospective examples are outlined in Table 2 as this food processing method has not been commercially approved by the FDA. Since there is currently insufficient data on electrical conductivities for solid foods, it is difficult to prove the high quality and safe process design for ohmic heating. Additionally, a successful 12D reduction for C. botulinum prevention has yet to be validated.

Table 2. Applications of Ohmic Heating in Food Processing
Applications	Advantages	Food Items
Sterilisation, heating liquid foods containing large particulates and heat sensitive liquids, aseptic processing	Attractive appearance, firmness properties, pasteurization of milk without protein denaturation	Cauliflower florets, soups, stews, fruit slices in syrups and sauces, ready to cook meals containing particulates, milk, juices, and fruit purees
Ohmic cooking of solid foods	The cooking time could be reduced significantly. The centre temperature rises much faster than in conventional heating, improving the final sterility of the product, less power consumption and safer product	Hamburger patties, meat patties, minced beef, vegetable pieces, chicken, pork cuts
Space food and military ration	Food reheating and waste sterilization. Less energy consumption for heating food to serving temperature, products in reusable pouches with long shelf life. Additive free foods with good keeping quality of 3 years.	Stew type foods
Ohmic thawing	Thawing without increase in moisture content of the product	Shrimp blocks
Inactivation of spores and enzymes	To improve food safety and enhance shelf life, increased stability and energy efficiency, Reduced time for inactivation of lipoxygenase and polyphenol oxidase, inactivation of enzymes without affecting flavor	Process fish cake, orange juice, juices
Blanching and extraction	Enhanced moisture loss and increase in juice yield	Potato slices, vegetable purees extraction of sucrose from sugar beets, extraction of soy milk from soy beans

=== Materials synthesis, recovery and processing ===
Flash joule heating (transient high-temperature electrothermal heating) has been used to synthesize allotropes of carbon, including graphene and diamond. Heating various solid carbon feedstocks (carbon black, coal, coffee grounds, etc.) to temperatures of ~3000 K for 10-150 milliseconds produces turbostratic graphene flakes. FJH has also been used to recover rare-earth elements used in modern electronics from industrial wastes. Beginning from a fluorinated carbon source, fluorinated activated carbon, fluorinated nanodiamond, concentric carbon (carbon shell around a nanodiamond core), and fluorinated flash graphene can be synthesized.

== Gallery ==
Joule heating applications
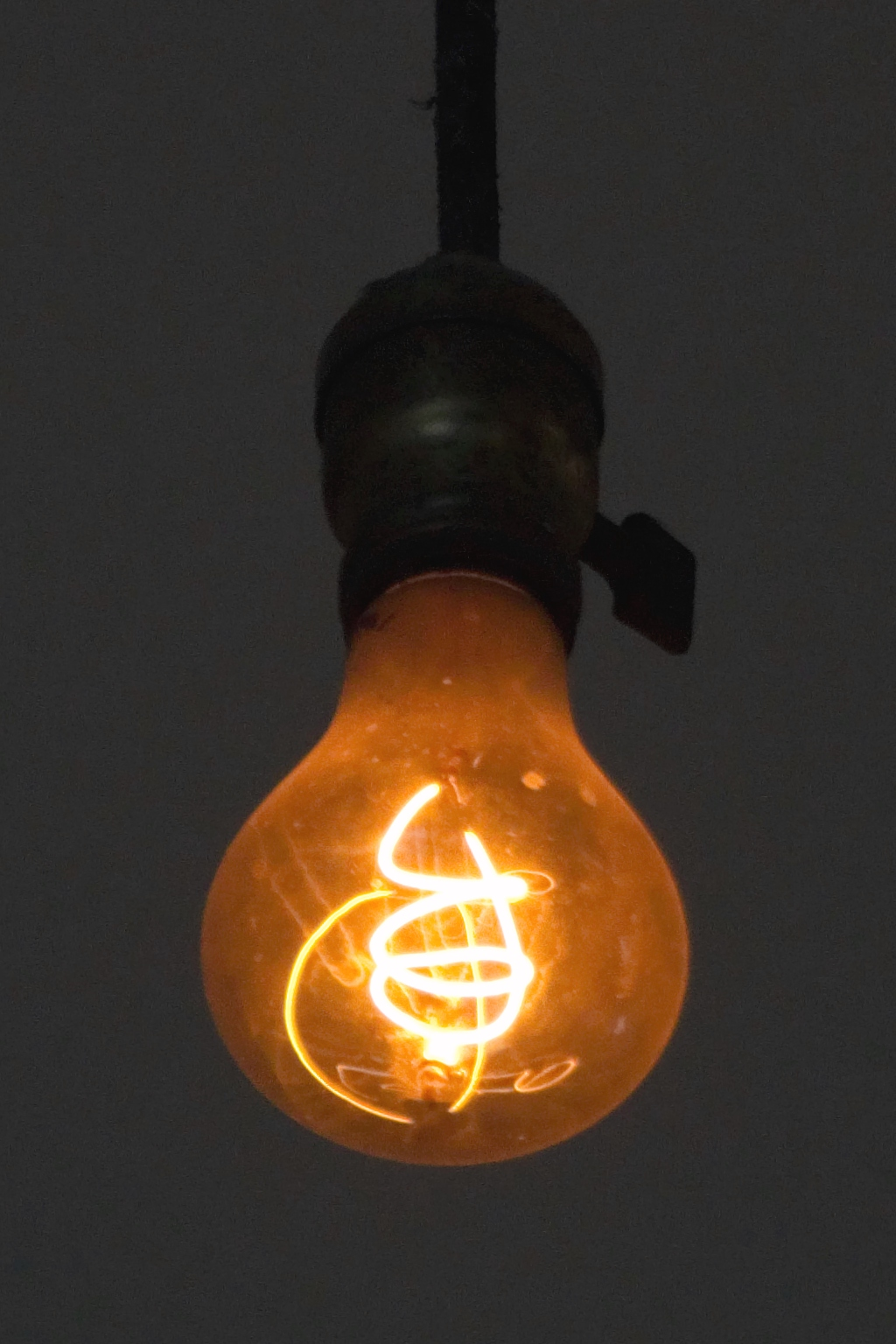
An incandescent light bulb's filament emitting light

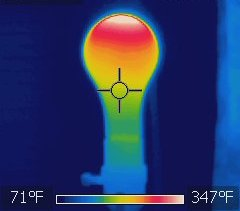
Infrared-thermal image of a light bulb

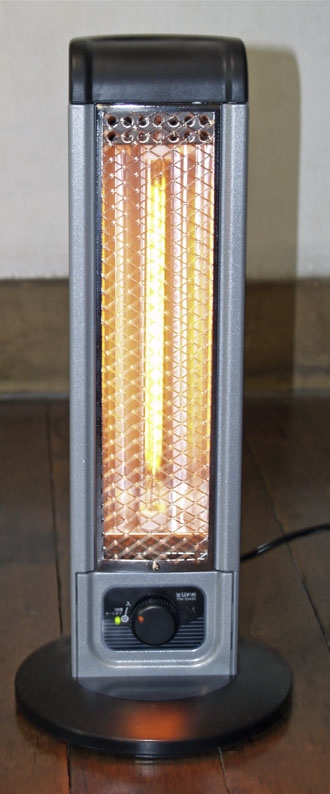
Electric radiative space heater

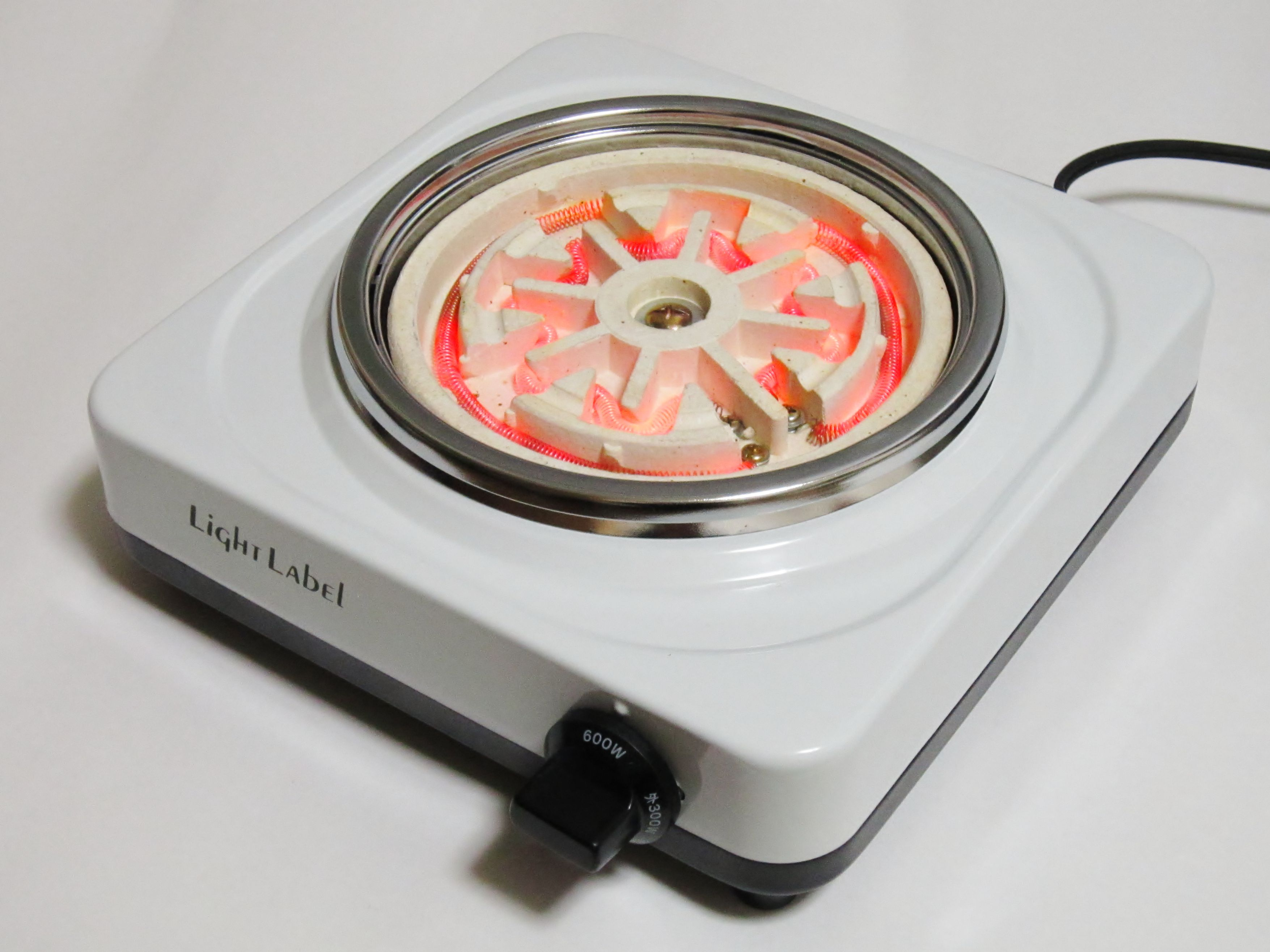
Electric tabletop hotplate

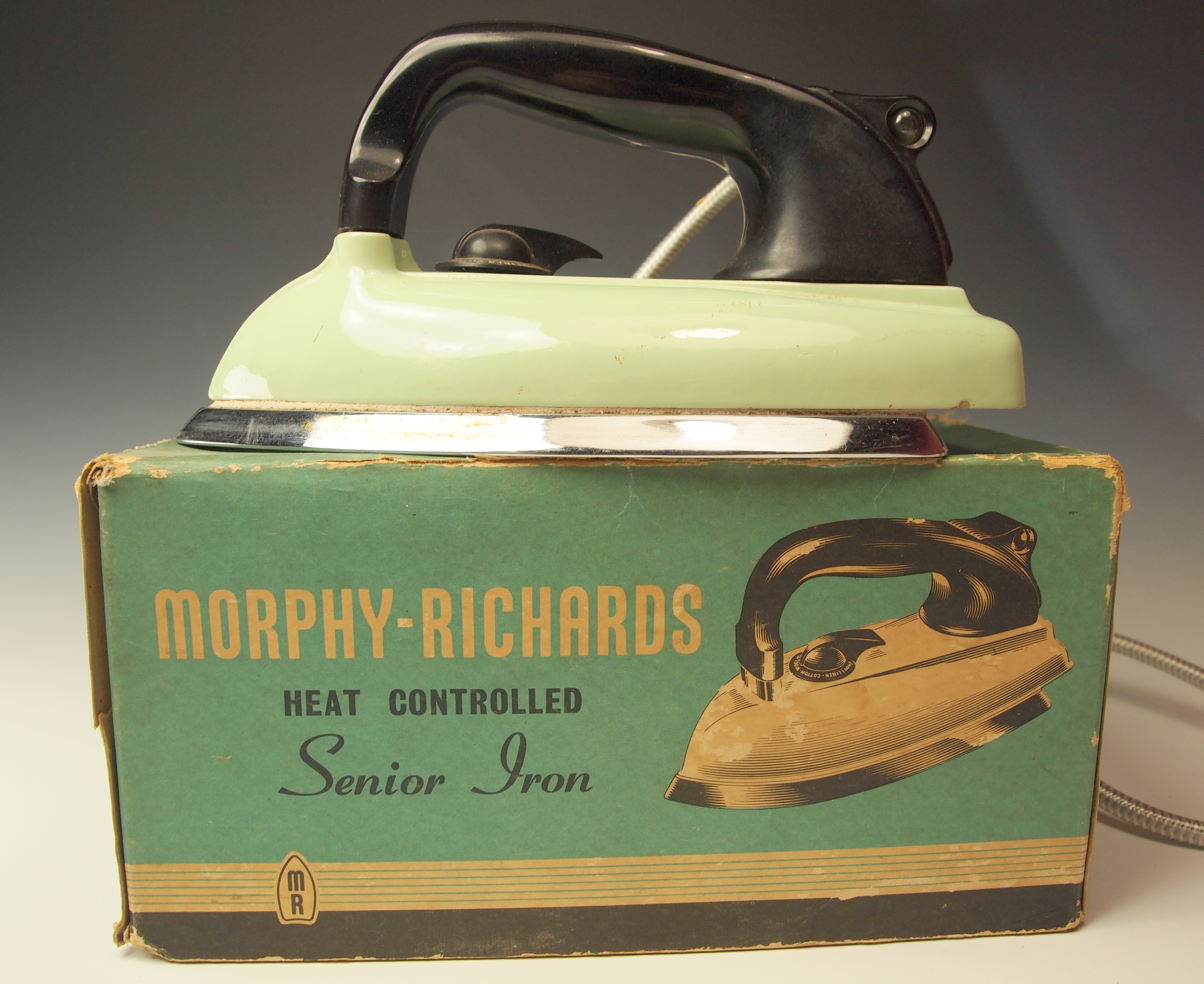
Clothes iron used to remove wrinkles from clothes

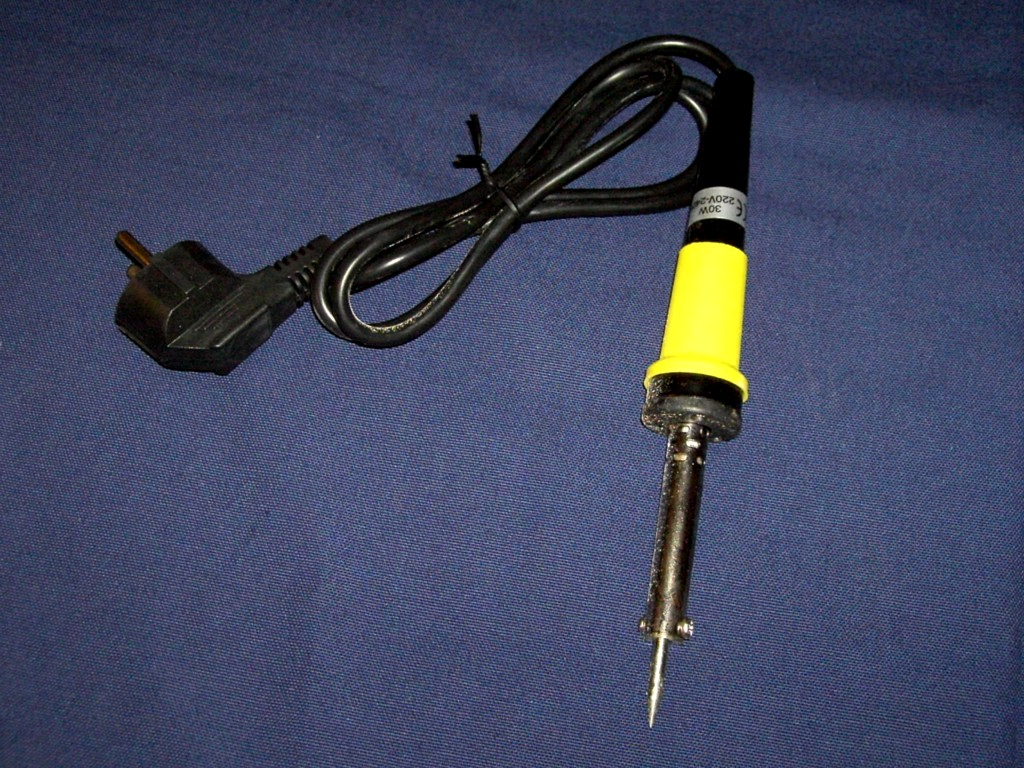
Soldering iron, used to melt solder in electronic work

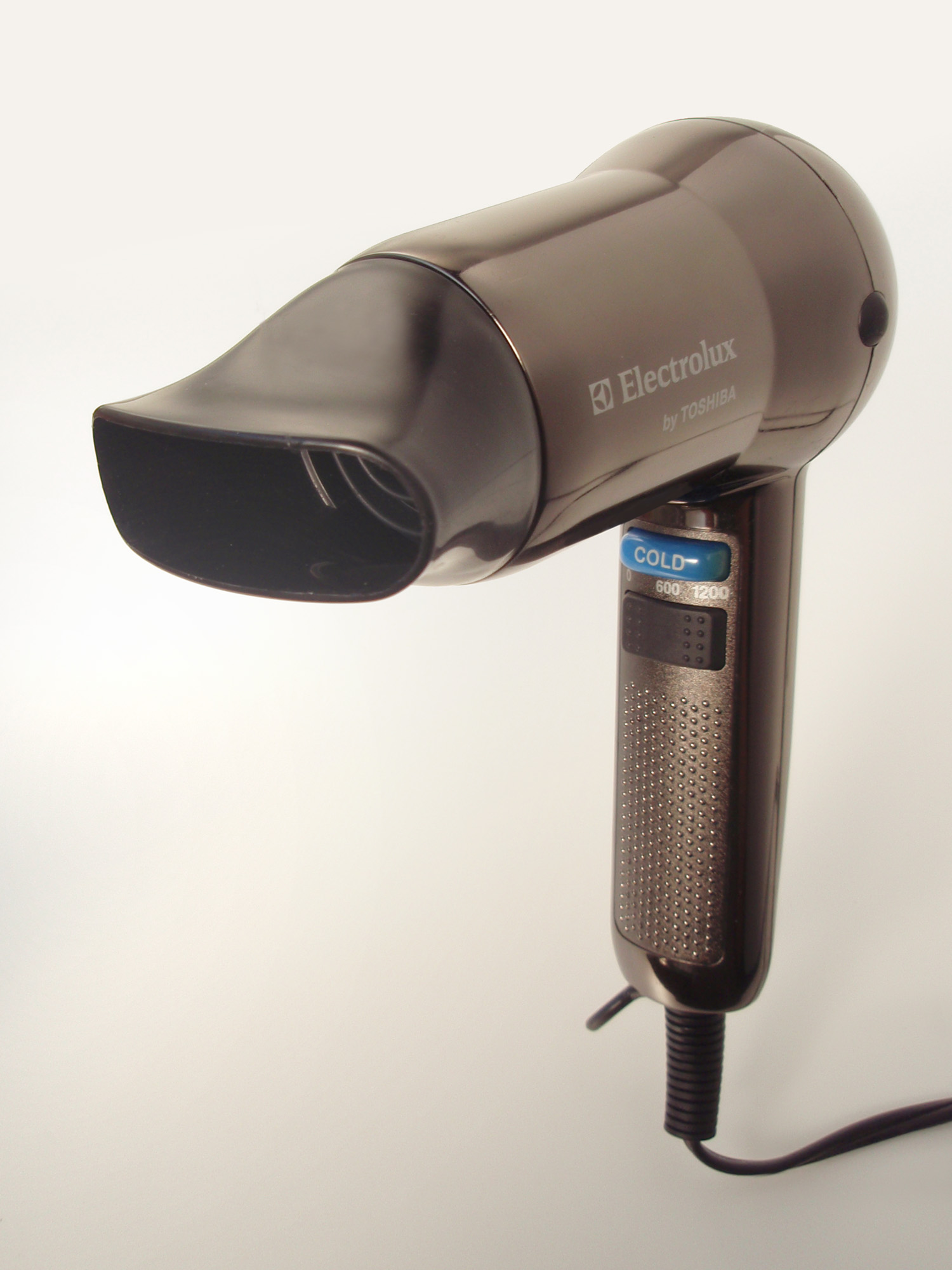
Hair dryer, produces hot air flow

== Heating efficiency ==
Heat is not to be confused with internal energy or synonymously thermal energy. While intimately connected to heat, they are distinct physical quantities.

As a heating technology, Joule heating has a coefficient of performance of 1.0, meaning that every joule of electrical energy supplied produces one joule of heat. In contrast, a heat pump can have a coefficient of more than 1.0 since it moves additional thermal energy from the environment to the heated item.

The definition of the efficiency of a heating process requires defining the boundaries of the system to be considered. When heating a building, the overall efficiency is different when considering heating effect per unit of electric energy delivered on the customer's side of the meter, compared to the overall efficiency when also considering the losses in the power plant and transmission of power.

== Hydraulic equivalent ==
In the energy balance of groundwater flow a hydraulic equivalent of Joule's law is used:

$$\frac{dE}{dx} = \frac{(v_x)^2}{K}$$

where:

- $dE/dt$ = loss of hydraulic energy ($E$) due to friction of flow in $x$-direction per unit of time (m/day), comparable to $P$
- $v_x$ = flow velocity in $x$-direction (m/day), comparable to $I$
- $K$ = hydraulic conductivity of the soil (m/day), the hydraulic conductivity is inversely proportional to the hydraulic resistance which compares to $R$

== See also ==
- Dielectric heating – Heating using radio waves
- Heating element – Device that converts electricity into heat
- Induction heating – Process of heating an electrically conducting object by electromagnetic induction
- Joule's second law – Phenomenon of non-ideal fluids changing temperature
- Molybdenum disilicide
- Nichrome – Family of alloys of mainly nickel and chromium
- Overheating (electricity) – Elevated temperature in an electric circuit
- Resistance wire – Type of electrical wire
- Electric resistance welding – Welding by passing electric current through work pieces
- Thermal management (electronics) – Regulation of the temperature of electronic circuitry to prevent inefficiency or failure
- Tungsten
