= Resistance wire =

Type of electrical wire

Resistance wire is wire intended for making electrical resistors (which are used to control the amount of current in a circuit). It is better if the alloy used has a high resistivity, since a shorter wire can then be used. In many situations, the stability of the resistor is of primary importance, and thus the alloy's temperature coefficient of resistivity and corrosion resistance play a large part in material selection.

When resistance wire is used for heating elements (in electric heaters, toasters, and the like), high resistivity and oxidation resistance are important.

Sometimes resistance wire is insulated by ceramic powder and sheathed in a tube of another alloy. Such heating elements are used in electric ovens and water heaters, and in specialized forms for cooktops.

== Types ==
Nichrome, a non-magnetic 80/20 alloy of nickel and chromium, is the most common resistance wire for heating purposes because it has a high resistivity and resistance to oxidation at high temperatures, up to 1,400 °C (2,550 °F). When used as a heating element, resistance wire is usually wound into coils.

Kanthal (Alloy 875/815), a family of iron-chromium-aluminium (FeCrAl) alloys, is used in a wide range of high-temperature applications, up to about 1,425 °C (2,597 °F). One difficulty in using nichrome or kanthal wire is that common tin-based electrical solder will not bond with it, so the connections to the electrical power must be made using other methods such as crimp connectors or screw terminals.

Constantan (Cu_{55}Ni_{45}) has a low temperature coefficient of resistivity, and as a copper alloy, it is easily soldered. Other constant-resistance alloys include manganin (Cu_{86}Mn_{12}Ni_{2}), Cupron (Cu_{53}Ni_{44}Mn_{3}), and Evanohm. It melts at about 1,220 °C (2,230 °F).

Balco (Ni_{70}Fe_{30}) and similar alloys have very high, but more linear, temperature coefficients of resistivity, making them suitable for sensing elements.

Many elements and alloys have been used as resistance wire for special purposes. The table below lists the resistivity of some common materials. The resistivity of amorphous carbon actually has a range of 3.8–4.1 μΩ⋅m.

Material	Resistivity	
Material	(Ω-cmil/ft)	(μΩ⋅cm)
Aluminum	15.94	2.650
Brass	42.1	7.0
Carbon (amorphous)	≃23.8	≃3.95
Constantan	272.97	45.38
Copper	10.09	1.678
Iron	57.81	9.61
Kanthal	842.19	140
Manganin	290	48.21
Molybdenum	32.12	5.34
Nichrome	675	112.2
Nichrome V	650	108.1
Nickel	41.69	6.93
Platinum	63.16	10.5
Stainless steel (304)	541	90
Steel (0.5% carbon)	100	16.62
Zinc	35.49	5.90

== Trade names ==
Trade names include:

MWS Wire Ind.	Carpenter Tech.	Driver-Harris	Harrison	Hoskins	Jelliff	Kanthal
MWS-875	Alchrome 875		HAI-FeCr AI 25	Alloy 875		Kanthal A-1
MWS-800	Evanohm	Karma	HAI-431	Chromel R	Alloy 800	Nikrothal L
MWS-675	Tophet C	Nichrome	HAI-NiCr 60	Chromel C	Alloy C	Nikrothal 6
MWS-650	Tophet A	Nichrome V	HAI-NiCr 80	Chromel A	Alloy A	Nikrothal 8
MWS-294	Cupron	Advance	HAI-CuNi 102	Copel	Alloy 45	Cuprothal 294
MWS-180	180 Alloy	Midohm	HAI-180	Alloy 380	Alloy 180	Cuprothal 180
MWS-120	Balco	Hytemco	HAI-380		Alloy 120	
MWS-90	90 Alloy	#95 Alloy	HAI-90	Alloy 290	Alloy 90	Cuprothal 90
MWS-60	60 Alloy	Lohm	HAI-60	Alloy 260	Alloy 60	Cuprothal 60
MWS-30	30 Alloy	#30 Alloy	HAI-30	Alloy 230	Alloy 30	Cuprothal 30
