= Zirconium hydride =

Alloy of zirconium and hydrogen

Zirconium hydride describes alloys with the formula ZrH_{x}. They are dark gray to black metallic powders. These alloys behave as usual metals in terms of electrical conductivity and magnetic properties (paramagnetic. Similar to other metal hydrides, different crystalline phases of zirconium hydrides are labeled with Greek letters, and α is reserved for the metal.

Known ZrH_{x} phases are γ (x = 1), δ (x = 1.5–1.65) and ε (x = 1.75–2). Often samples are mixtures: the compositions with x = 0.8–1.5 usually contain a mixture of α, γ and δ phases, and δ and ε phases coexist for x = 1.65–1.75. As a function of increasing x, the transition between δ-Zr and ε-Zr is observed as a gradual distortion of the face-centered cubic δ (fluorite-type) to face-centered tetragonal ε lattice. This distortion is accompanied by a rapid decrease in Vickers hardness, which is constant at 260 HV for x < 1.6, linearly decreases to 160 HV for 1.6 < x < 1.75 and stabilizes at about 160 HV for 1.75 < x < 2.0. This hardness decrease is accompanied by the decrease in magnetic susceptibility. The mass density behaves differently with the increasing hydrogen content: it decreases linearly from 6.52 to 5.66 g/cm^{3} for x = 0–1.6 and changes little for x = 1.6–2.0. The zirconium-hydrogen system exhibits temperature-dependent solubility limits in α-zirconium. When the hydrogen concentration exceeds these limits termed as Terminal solid solublity, zirconium hydride phases precipitate, as represented in the Zr-H phase diagram.

Hydrogen acts as a hardening agent, preventing dislocations in the zirconium atom crystal lattice from sliding past one another. Varying the amount of hydrogen and the form of its presence in the zirconium hydride (precipitated phase) controls qualities such as the hardness, ductility, and tensile strength of the resulting zirconium hydride. Zirconium hydride with increased hydrogen content can be made harder and stronger than zirconium, but such zirconium hydride is also less ductile than zirconium.

== Material properties ==
The density of zirconium hydride varies based the hydrogen and ranges between 5.56 and 6.52 g cm^{−3}.

Even in the narrow range of concentrations make up zirconium hydride, mixtures of hydrogen and zirconium can form a number of structures, with distinct properties. At room temperature, α-zirconium dissolve no more than 0.069 wt% at 550 °C. β-zirconium can dissolve considerably more hydrogen, more than 1.2% hydrogen above 900 °C.

Approximate formula	CAS number	Molecular weight	Density g/cm^{3}	Symmetry	Space group	No	Pearson symbol
ZrH	13940-37-9	92.232	5.9	Orthorhombic	Cccm	66	oS8
ZrH_{1.6}			5.66	Cubic	Fm3̅m	225	cF12
ZrH_{2}	7704-99-6	93.240	5.56	Tetragonal	I4/mmm	139	tI6
ZrH_{4}	15457-96-2	95.256					

== Preparation and chemical properties ==
Zirconium hydrides form upon interaction of the metal with hydrogen gas. Hydrogen absorbed by zirconium can diffuse through metal lattice, allowing hydrogen to redistribute within the material before precipitating as hydride phases. Whereas this reaction occurs even at room temperature, homogeneous bulk hydrogenation is usually achieved by annealing at temperatures of 400–600 °C for a period between several hours and a few weeks.

At room temperature, zirconium hydrides quickly oxidize in air. The formed nanometer-thin layer of oxide inhibits further oxygen diffusion into the material, and thus the change in composition due to oxidation can usually be neglected. However, the oxidation proceeds deeper into the bulk with increasing temperature. The hydrogen is anionic due to the electronegativity difference between Zr and H. When prepared as thin films, the crystal structure can be improved and surface oxidation minimized.

Zirconium hydrides are dissolve in hydrofluoric acid.

== Applications ==
Formation of zirconium hydrides is an important factor in the operation of several types of nuclear reactors, such as boiling water reactors Fukushima I and II, which suffered from a series of explosions caused by the 2011 Tōhoku earthquake and tsunami. Their uranium fuel pellets are enclosed in metal rods made from Zircaloy – an alloy of typically about 98.25% zirconium with 1.5% tin and minor amounts of other metals. Zircaloy is used because of its small absorption cross-section for thermal neutrons and superior mechanical and corrosion properties to those of most metals, including zirconium. The rods are cooled by streaming water which gradually oxidizes zirconium, liberating hydrogen. In Fukushima reactors, the reactor cooling system failed because of the tsunami. The resulting temperature increase accelerated chemical reactions and caused accumulation of significant amounts of hydrogen, which exploded upon reaction with oxygen when the gas was released to the atmosphere.

In regular operation, most hydrogen is safely neutralized in the reactor systems; however, a fraction of 5-20% diffuses into the Zircaloy rods forming zirconium hydrides. This process mechanically weakens the rods because the hydrides have lower hardness and ductility than metal. Only a few percent of hydrogen can dissolve in zirconium. Excess hydrogen forms voids that weaken Zircalloy. Among Zircaloys, Zircaloy-4 is the least susceptible to hydrogen blistering.

It is also used as a neutron moderator in thermal-spectrum nuclear reactors such as the TRIGA research reactor developed by General Atomics or the Soviet TOPAZ nuclear reactors. At neutron energies above 0.14 eV it is as effective at moderating a nuclear reactor as elemental hydrogen (the best known material), but far more dense, and therefore permits compact reactors with high power per unit volume. It has neutron resonances that prevent almost all moderation at energies below 0.14 eV. Zirconium deuteride is superior, because it has a lower neutron absorption cross-section than aneutronic hydrogen, decreasing neutron absorption in a reactor.

As a pure powder, zirconium hydrides are used as hydrogenation catalysts, in powder metallurgy, and as getters in the vacuum tube industry. In vacuum systems, zirconium hydrides help establish a seal between a metal and ceramic. In this method, a hydride powder is mixed with the sealing metal; heating the mixture results in decomposition of the hydride. The evolving hydrogen cleans up the surrounding area, and the produced metal flows and forms a seal even at temperatures as low as 300 °C.

ZrH_{2} is used in powder metallurgy, as a hydrogenation catalyst, and as a reducing agent, vacuum tube getter, and a foaming agent in production of metal foams. Other uses include acting as a fuel in pyrotechnic compositions, namely pyrotechnic initiators.

Irradiation-assisted dissolution of inter-granular zirconium hydrides under 6 keV He implantation in situ in a Transmission Electron Microscope at MIAMI Facility, United Kingdom.

== Zirconium(II) dihydride ==
Zirconium(II) dihydride (ZrH_{2}) is an elusive molecular species. It has been generated by laser ablation and observed at low temperature.

== Uses ==
Zirconium(II) hydride is used as a thermal neutron moderator in nuclear reactors and as a material for neutron reflectors in fast reactors.

Zirconium(II) hydride in the form of a powder is used in powder metallurgy as a hydrogenation catalyst, vacuum tube getter, foaming agent in the production of metal foams and as a reducing agent.

== Safety ==
When exposed to air, zirconium hydrides are flammable and can ignite and explode if exposed to heat, fire, or sparks. Zirconium hydrides can react violently with water, acids, oxidizers or halogenated compounds.
