= Balco alloy =

Balco is a nickel-iron alloy with a thermal conductivity similar to nickel but twice the resistivity. It is used for making low cost resistance temperature sensors. It consists of 70% nickel and 30% iron.

Balco is Carpenter Technology Corporation's brand name for this alloy consisting of 70% nickel and 30% iron. It is also sold by Harrison as "Hytemco". Its principal use is for resistance thermometers (resistance temperature detectors). These change their electrical resistances as a predictable function of temperature, making it useful as a thermometer with electrical output. Balco has a temperature coefficient of resistance of 0.00518 Ω/Ω/°C nearly as high as that of pure nickel (0.00672) but with much better linearity. It is also mechanically strong and fairly corrosion resistant.

Pure platinum is preferred for the most precise resistance temperature detector elements in spite of its price and lower temperature coefficient (0.00385). This is because of its long-term stability and repeatability.

== See also ==
- Thermometer
