= Pyrotechnics =

Science of creating combustibles and explosives for entertainment

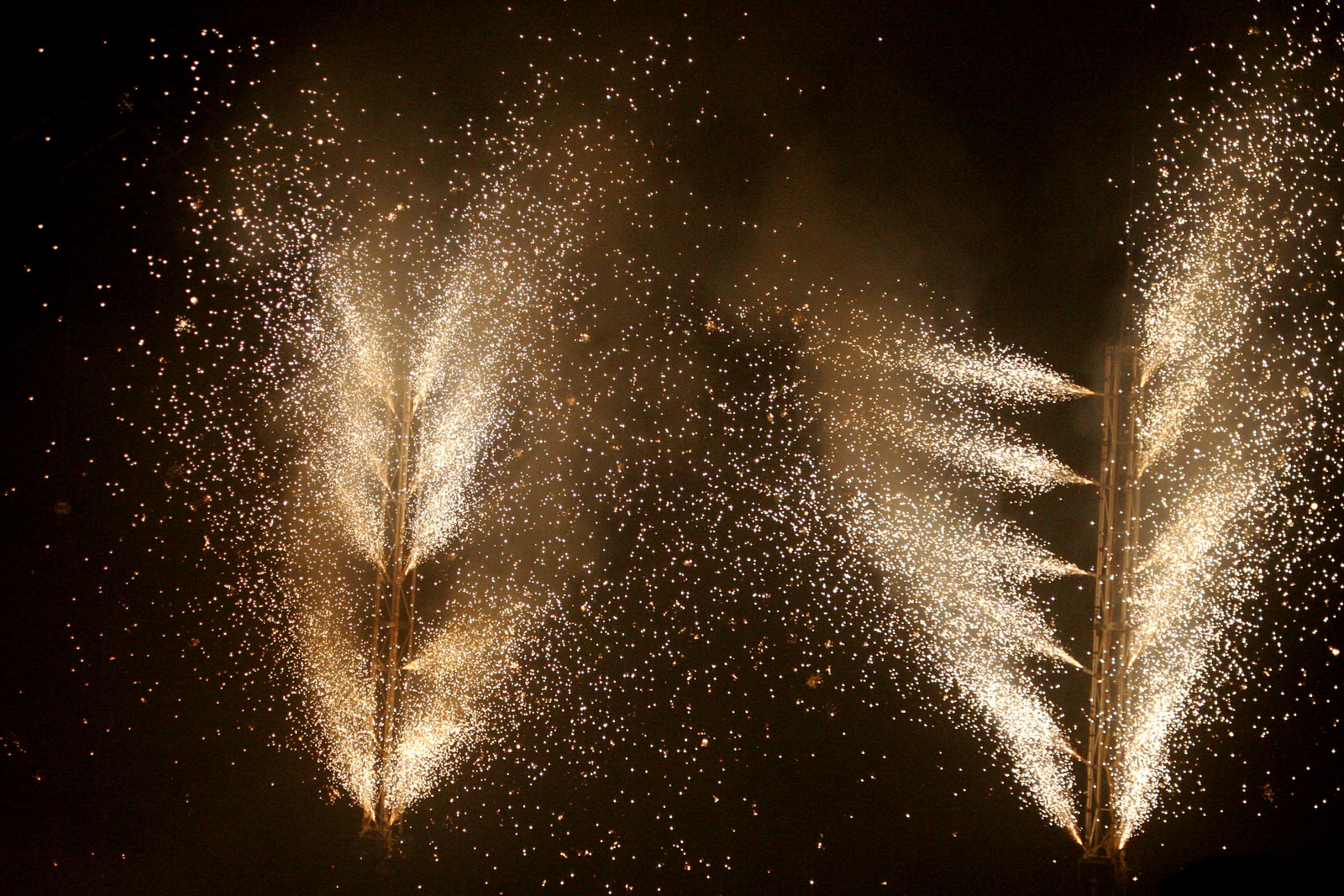
Pyrotechnic gerbs used in the entertainment industry

Pyrotechnics is the science and craft of creating fireworks, but also includes safety matches, oxygen candles, explosive bolts (and other fasteners), parts of automotive airbags, as well as gas-pressure blasting in mining, quarrying, and demolition. This trade relies upon self-contained and self-sustained exothermic chemical reactions to make heat, light, gas, smoke and/or sound. The name comes from the Greek words pyr (πυρ; 'fire') and technikós (τεχνικός; 'artistic').

Improper use of pyrotechnics could lead to pyrotechnic accidents. People responsible for the safe storage, handling, and functioning of pyrotechnic devices are known as pyrotechnicians.

== Proximate pyrotechnics ==
Explosions, flashes, smoke, flames, fireworks and other pyrotechnic-driven effects used in the entertainment industry are referred to as proximate pyrotechnics. Proximate refers to the pyrotechnic device's location relative to an audience. In the majority of jurisdictions, special training and licensing must be obtained from local authorities to legally prepare and use proximate pyrotechnics.

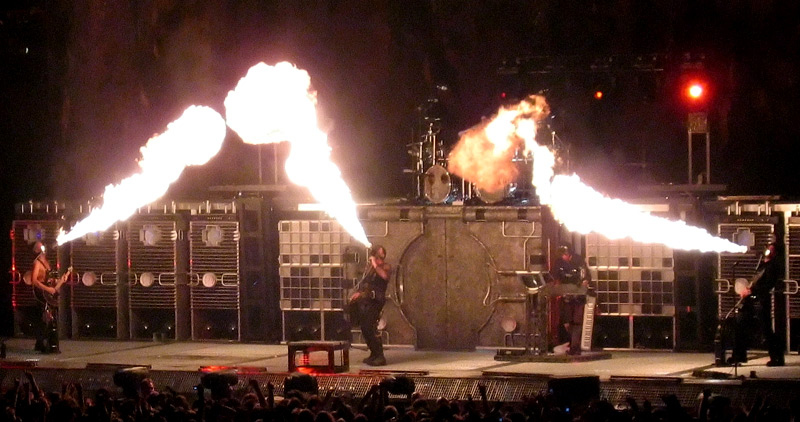
Rammstein uses pyrotechnics numerous times in their concerts; their performance of "Feuer frei!" is pictured here.

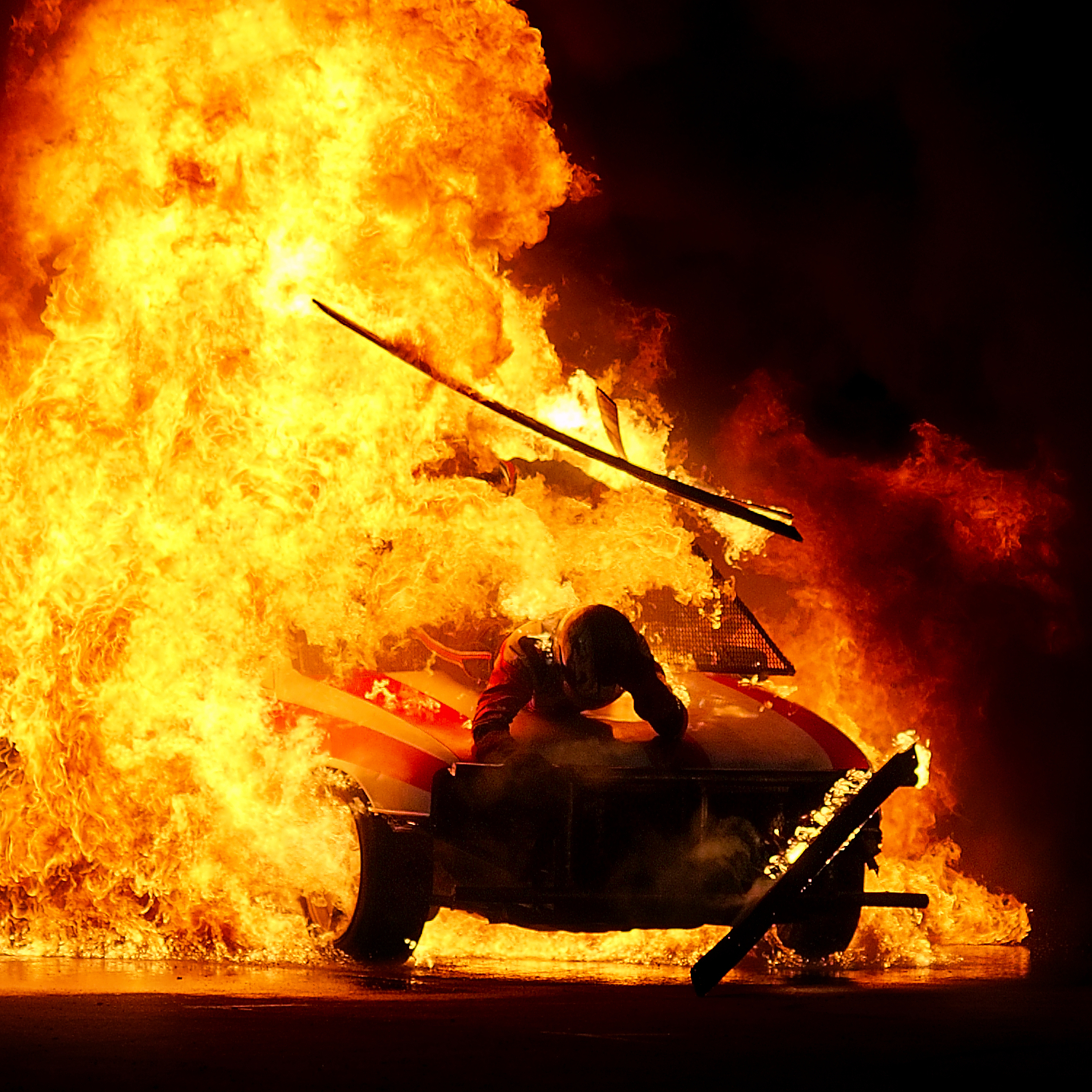
Pyrotechnics stunt exhibition by Giant Auto Rodéo, Ciney, Belgium

Many musical groups use pyrotechnics to enhance their live shows. Pink Floyd were innovators of pyrotechnic use in concerts. For instance, at the climax of their song "Careful with That Axe, Eugene", a blast of smoke was set off at the back of the stage. Bands like the Who, Kiss and Queen soon followed with the use of pyrotechnics in their shows. Michael Jackson attempted to use pyrotechnics in a 1984 Pepsi advertisement, where a stray spark caused a small fire in his hair. German industrial metal band Rammstein are renowned for their incorporation of a large variety of pyrotechnics into performances, which range from flaming costumes to face-mounted flamethrowers. Nightwish, Lordi, Sabaton and Parkway Drive are also known for their vivid pyrotechnics at concerts. Many professional wrestlers have also used pyrotechnics as part of their entrances to the ring.

Modern pyrotechnics are, in general, divided into categories based upon the type of effect produced or manufacturing method. The most common categories are:

- Airburst – Hanging charges designed to burst into spheres of sparks. Primarily used to provide an effect similar to an aerial shell without producing fallout. May also be designed to launch pieces of confetti or streamers. A plurality of airbursts is usually achieved with a harness.
- Binary powders – Kits divided into separate oxidizer and fuel, intended to be mixed on site before being loaded into hardware.
- Comet (meteor) – Brightly colored burning pellets resembling shooting stars. These are no larger than 50 mm for proximate use. Crossette comets carry a cavity filled with a small amount of burst charge in the middle which causes the stars to split into four pieces. Crossette comets are usually no larger than 45 mm for proximate use.
- Flame Mortars – These articles use a smokeless powder-based composition to produce a rising column or a rolling ball of fire in various colors. Duration is typically 5 seconds or less for proximate pyrotechnics, and the diameter is usually 1 to 4 inches.
- Flare – Cylindrical tubes containing a pressed pyrotechnic composition intended to produce a bright flame of various colors. Proximate flares are usually 2 to 6 inches in length and 0.5-1 inches in diameter, and may last 60 seconds or longer.
- Flash Paper/Flash String/Flash Cotton – Stored and transported when wet with either water or alcohol, these are different forms of nitrocellulose which burn with very little smoke or ash, and are popularly used as hand flashes for magicians, amongst other uses.
- Flash Trays – A preloaded tube 6 to 18 inches with a slit cut between the two end plugs. Used to produce a fan pattern flash and spray of sparks.
- Flash Pots – Preloaded cylindrical tubes 2 to 4 inches long and 0.5 to 1 inches in diameter used to emit bright flashes of light, often with a bang or spray of sparks.
- Gerbs – Pyrotechnic fountains used to produce a controlled plume of sparks, and may be classified as fast gerbs or duration gerbs depending on the burn duration. Special waterfall gerbs are often used to produce an effect similar to a waterfall, using several hung upside down in a line.
- Line Rockets – A device attached to a line to produce thrust. Typically has a duration of 5 seconds or less. May also produce a whistle effect.
- Ice Fountains – A gerb-type device with no choke specifically used to provide a low-smoke alternative to gerbs, at the cost of lower height.
- Mines – Devices containing multiple stars, propelled into the air using a lift charge. Special mine-comet effects feature both mines and comets in the same article.
- Mortar Hits – Produces a bright flash and a puff of smoke, and may be designed to produce noise in addition to the effect. Concussion mortars are special mortars exclusively used to produce loud bangs, and may be used to accentuate other effects.
- Multi-Shot Devices – Articles used to chain multiple effects together, may be timed or instantaneous.
- Smoke Cartridges – Used to produce a plume of smoke, duration and size vary greatly depending on the device used.
- Smoke Cookies – Compressed discs of pyrotechnic composition used to produce a smoke effect.
- Spark Hits – Used to simulate short circuits in an electrical panel.
- Saxons – Articles that produce revolving showers of sparks, consisting of two gerb-type devices pinned at the center.
- Shock Tubing – A special thermoplastic tube used to simulate lightning strikes and the resulting thunder, using special igniters.
- Squib – an initiator-driven or gas-generating charge of ~10 mm, producing an instantaneous, localised burst for impact, rupture or debris effects.
- Strobe Pots – Used to produce multiple flashes of light.

Various ingredients may be added to pyrotechnic devices to provide colour, smoke, noise or sparks. Special additives and construction methods are used to modify the character of the effect produced, either to enhance or subdue the effect. For example, placing layers of pyrotechnic compounds containing potassium perchlorate, sodium salicylate or sodium benzoate with layers that do not create a fountain of sparks with an undulating whistle.

In general, such pyrotechnic devices are initiated by a remotely controlled electrical signal that causes an electric match, or e-match, to produce ignition. The remote control may be manual, via a switch console, or computer controlled according to a pre-programmed sequence and/or a sequence that tracks the live performance via stage cues.

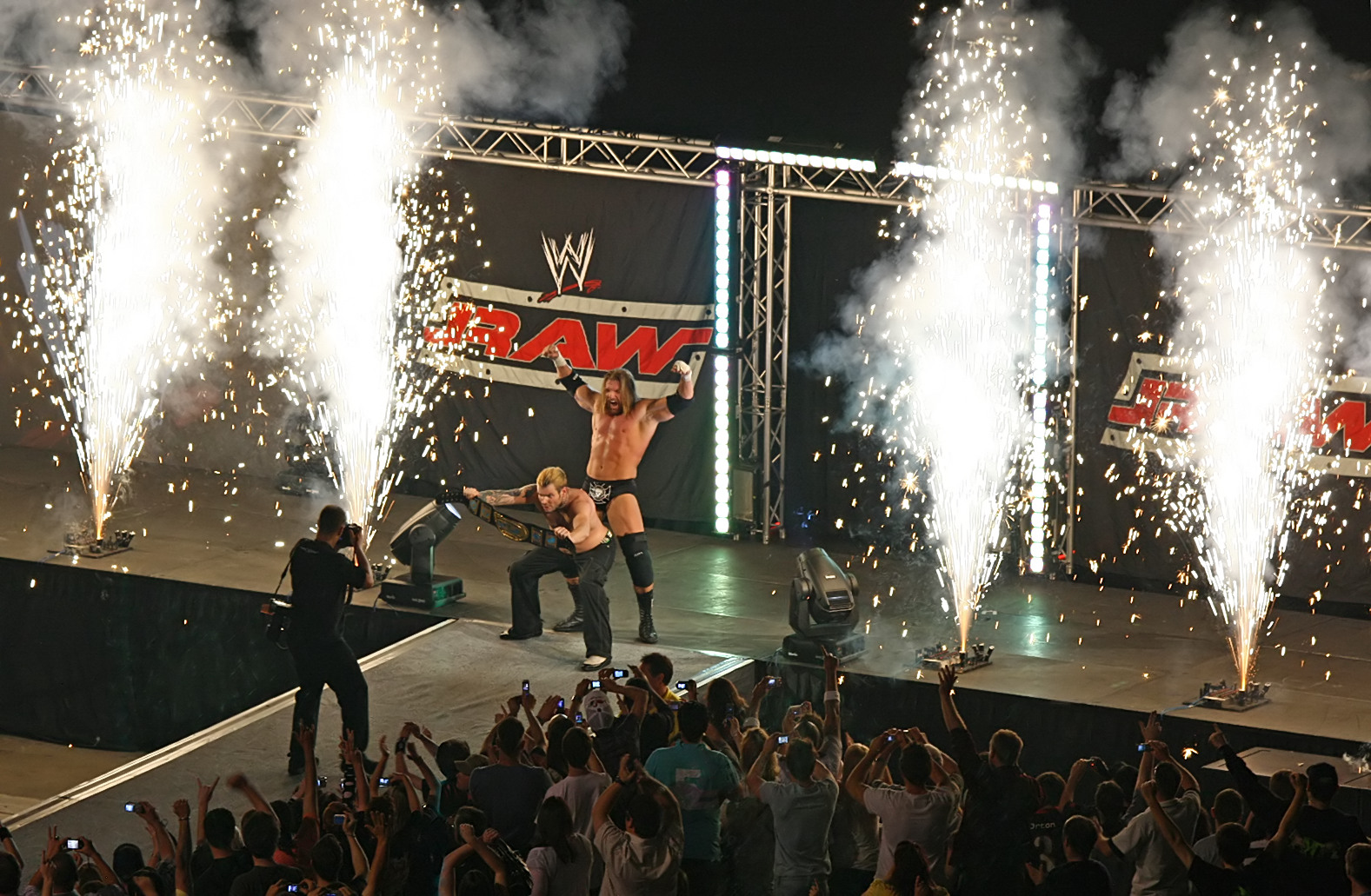
Pyrotechnics are widely used in professional wrestling, including the WWE, to enhance the event. Special concussion mortars are often used to augment these effects, as most of these are low-noise effects.

== Display pyrotechnics ==
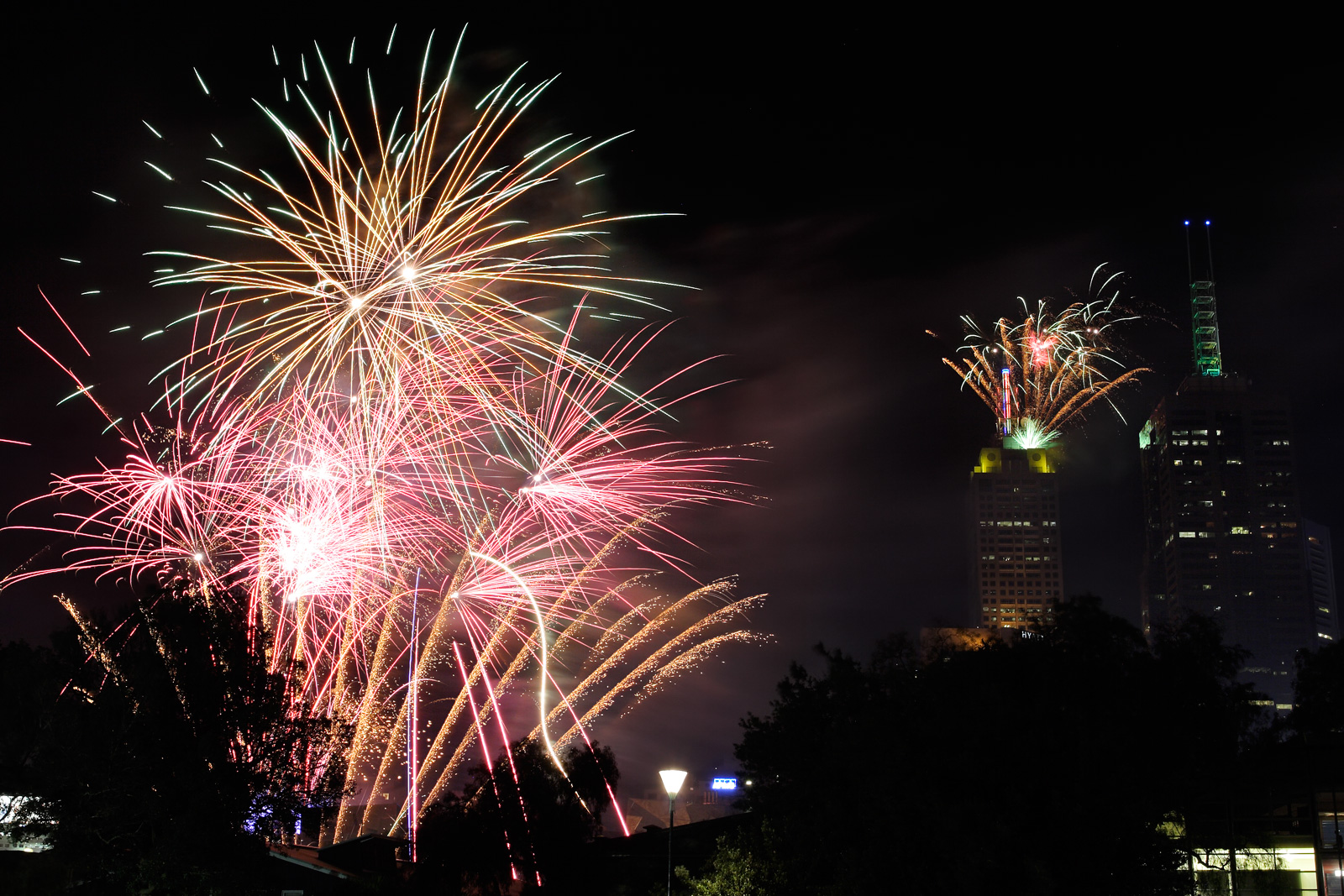
The 2008-09 Melbourne NYE fireworks, as seen from Alexandra Gardens

Display pyrotechnics, also known as commercial fireworks, are pyrotechnic devices intended for use outdoors, where the audience can be further away, and smoke and fallout is less of a concern. The effects, though often similar to proximate pyrotechnics, are generally larger and more vigorous in nature. It will typically take an entire day to set up a professional fireworks display. This work is normally undertaken on temporarily secured locations by specialist companies employing teams of experienced pyrotechnicians.

In modern times, a familiar feature of larger fireworks displays are aerial shells, which commonly appear as spherical bursts of stars in the sky. The exterior of these shells are normally made of a hard paper-adhesive layered composite which holds the interior stars arranged around a burst charge, or other pyrotechnic effects. Aerial shells are fired out of mortars from the ground and have internal timing fuses that accurately and reliably position their bursts. A continuous sequence of shells are launched, often with effects artistically choreographed to music and themes, accompanied by various types of ground effects. Modern fireworks displays are commonly executed to a designed program using electrical wiring and ignition linked to an electronic firing system.

The size of these fireworks can range from 50 mm (2") to over 600 mm (24") in diameter depending on the type of effect and available distance from the audience. In most jurisdictions, special fireworks training and licensing must be obtained from local authorities to legally prepare and use display pyrotechnics.

== Consumer pyrotechnics ==
Consumer pyrotechnics are devices readily available for purchase to the general public with little or no special licensing or training. These items are considered relatively low hazard devices but, like all pyrotechnics, can still be hazardous and should be stored, handled and used appropriately. Some of the most common examples of consumer pyrotechnics encountered include recreational fireworks (such as whistling and sparking types), model rocket motors, highway and marine distress flares, sparklers and caps for toy guns. Pyrotechnics are also indirectly involved in other consumer products such as powder actuated nail guns, ammunition for firearms, and modern fireplaces. Some types, including bird scarers, shell crackers, whistle crackers and flares, may be designed to be fired from a 12-gauge pistol or rifle.

== Safety ==
Pyrotechnics are dangerous if not used properly and must be handled with care. Proximity pyrotechnics is an area of expertise which requires extra training beyond that of other professional pyrotechnics areas and the use of devices specifically manufactured for indoor, close proximity use. Despite this, accidents can still happen due to the use of low-quality products, or an unexpected event, or even an error on the part of the operator.

=== Homemade devices ===
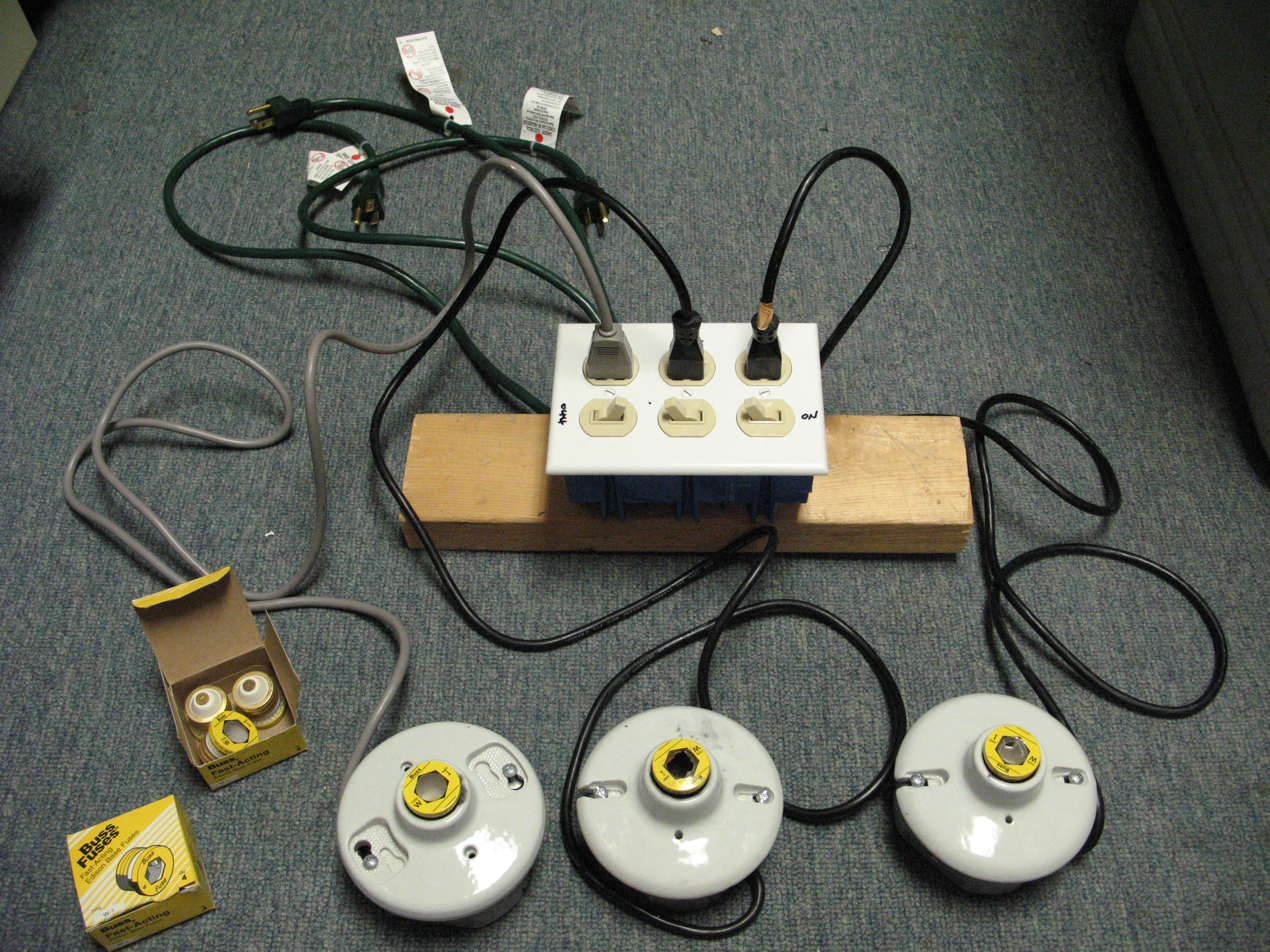
Homemade flash pots built without any safety mechanisms

A common low-budget pyrotechnic flash pot is built using modified screw-in electric fuses in a light fixture. The fuses are intentionally blown, acting as ignitors for a pyrotechnic material.

Homemade devices may fail to have safety features and can provide numerous hazards, including:

- A firing circuit using high-power, non-isolated AC line voltage can be a shock hazard to the operator and bystanders.
- The use of high-current fuses as ignitors can cause main circuit breakers and fuses to trip, due to the sudden inrush of hundreds of amperes through a dead-shorted circuit. Switches used to control ignition may be damaged from the high-current surges.
- There may not be indicators or interlocks preventing premature ignition of the pyrotechnic material. Screwing a powder-loaded fuse into an unknowingly powered socket will result in immediate ignition, injuring the operator.

Commercial flash pots include safety features such as warning pilot lamps, preignition grounding, and safing circuits. They also use isolated and low-voltage power sources, and have keyed power connections to help prevent accidental ignition.

== See also ==
- Fireworks
- List of pyrotechnic incidents
- List of nightclub fires
