= Squib (explosive) =

Small explosive device

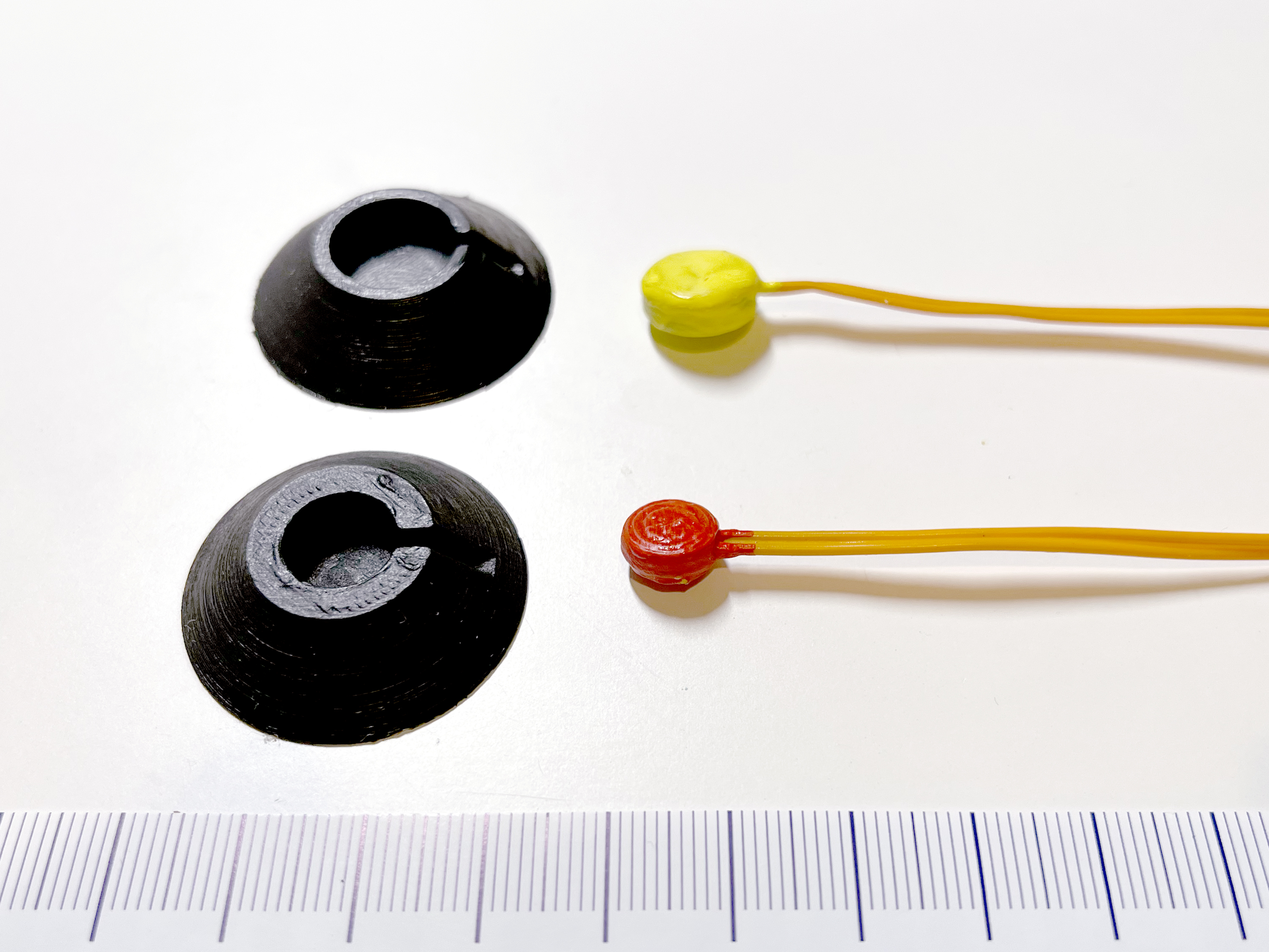
0.5 and 1 grain bullet hit squibs and solid polycarbonate backing shields to simulate a gunshot wound on an actor. A blood pack is to be built atop the squib.

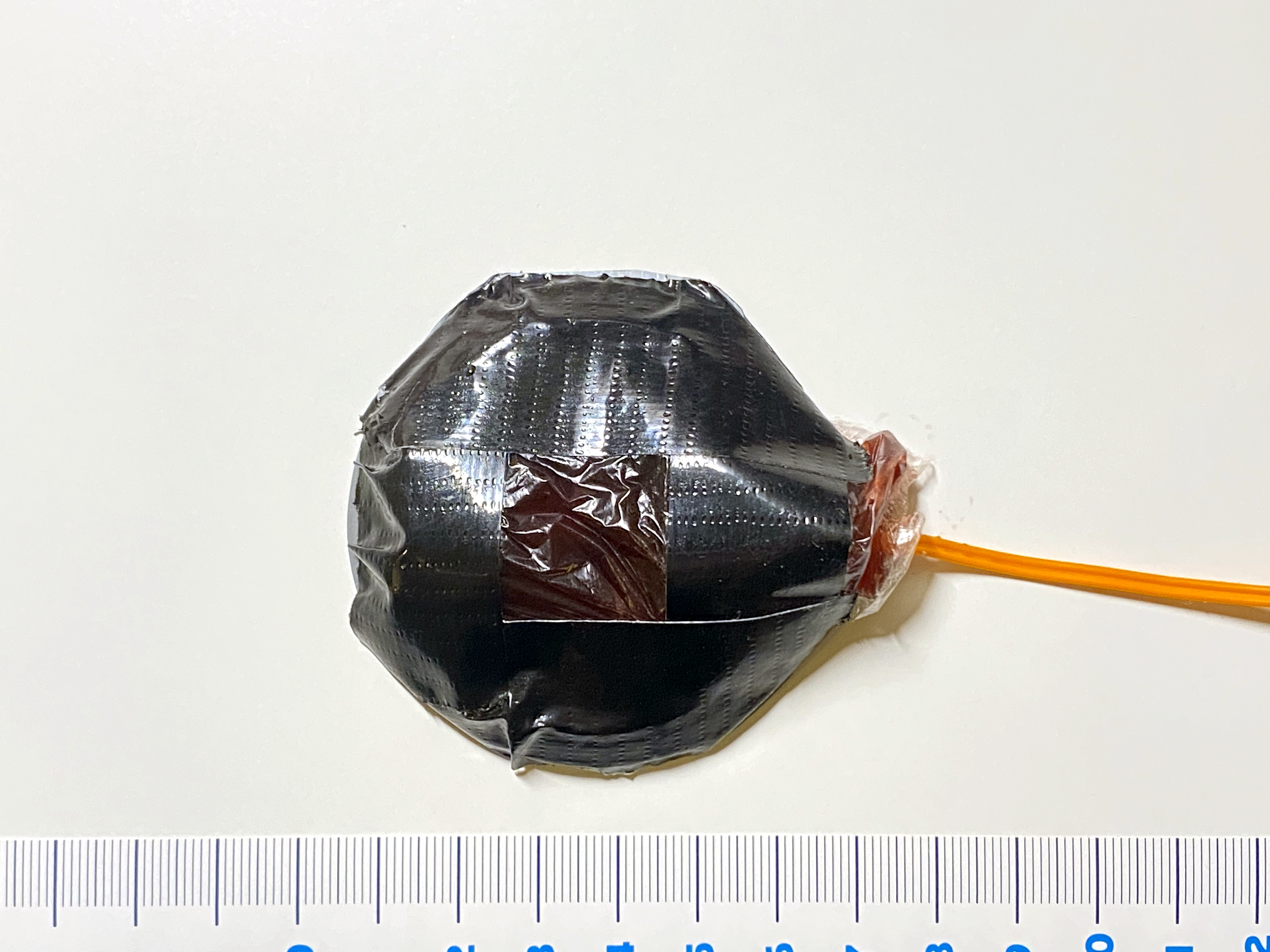
A bullet hit squib assembly example to be attached to an actor's wardrobe.

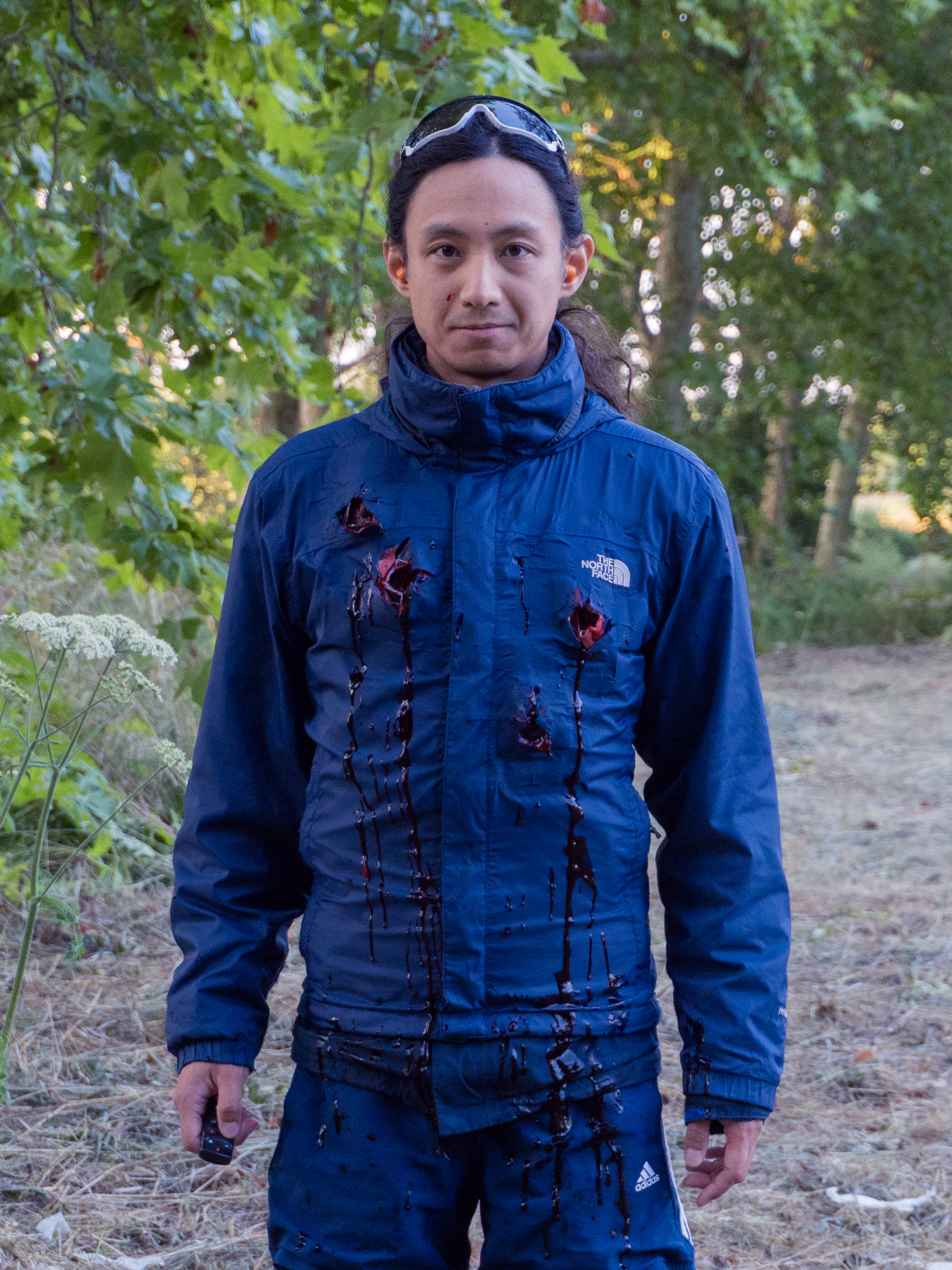
Aftermath of a gunshot wound stunt where bullet hit squibs hidden in the actor's costume blew open pre-scored "bullet holes", bursting fake blood through and subsequently running down the jacket.

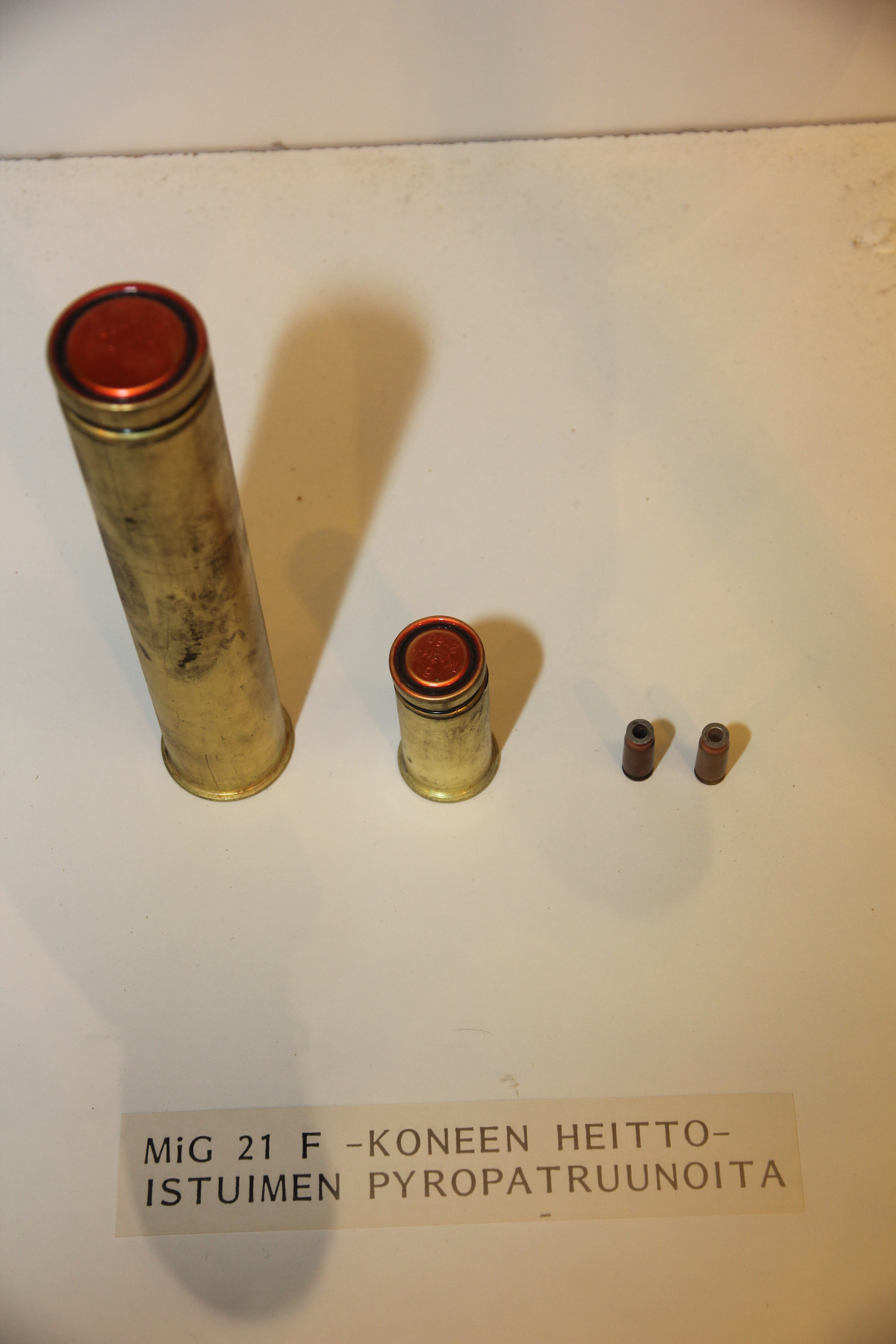
Pyrotechnic charges from ejector seat of MiG-21F-13 fighter in the Aviation Museum of Central Finland

A squib is a miniature explosive device used in a wide range of industries and applications, from special effects to the military. It resembles a tiny stick of dynamite, both in appearance and construction, but has considerably less explosive power. A modern squib includes two electrical leads separated by a plug of insulating material; a small bridge wire or electrical resistance heater; and a bead of heat-sensitive chemical composition, in which the bridge wire is embedded. Squibs can generate mechanical force to shatter or propel various materials; they can provide pyrotechnic effects for film and for live theatrics.

A squib generally consists of a small tube filled with an explosive substance, with a detonator running through the length of its core, similar to a stick of dynamite. Also similar to dynamite, the detonator can be a slow-burning fuse, or (as is more common today) a wire connected to a remote electronic trigger. Squibs range in size from ~2 to 15 mm (0.08 to 0.6 in) in diameter.

== Film industry ==
In the film industry, the term squib often refers to electric matches and detonators used to trigger larger pyrotechnics. They are generally (but not always) the main explosive element in an effect, and are often used in special effects to simulate bullet impacts on inanimate objects or actors. Fake blood packets are typically coupled with squibs and attached to the stage clothes worn by actors, referred to as dead-character costumes, that burst through pre-made "bullet" holes to simulate the appearance of a person being shot and wounded. This creates a realistic and convincing visual effect for movies, TV shows, and stage performances.

== Automotive industry ==
Squibs are used in emergency mechanisms where gas pressure needs to be generated quickly in confined spaces, while not harming any surrounding persons or mechanical parts. In this form, squibs may be called gas generators. Two such mechanisms are the inflation of automobile air bags and seat belt pretensioners which sometimes use pyrotechnic devices.

Pyro fuses are also used to disconnect the vehicle's power circuit. The pyro fuse is installed on the positive terminal of the battery and receives a signal from the vehicle's control unit in the event of an accident. During an accident, the pyrotechnic charge in the pyrofuse is triggered, which uses a piston to break the power circuit and de-energize the vehicle's battery.

In 2003, the European Commission adopted Directive 2000/53/EC on end-of-life vehicles (ELV Directive). This measure was introduced to prevent potential fires that may occur due to battery damage during an accident. Battery pyro-fuses ensure instant power disconnection, minimizing the risk of short circuits and fires

== Other uses ==
Squibs are also used in automatic fire extinguishers, to pierce seals that retain liquids such as halon, fluorocarbon, or liquid nitrogen.

== History ==
Squibs were originally made from parchment tubes, or from the shaft of a feather, and filled with fine black powder. They were then sealed at the ends with wax. They were sometimes used to ignite the main propellant charge in a cannon.

Squibs were once used in coal mining to break coal away from rock. In the 1870s, some versions of the device were patented and mass-produced as "Miners' Safety Squibs".

=== The famous "Squib Case" ===
Squibs are mentioned in the prominent tort case from eighteenth-century England, Scott v. Shepherd, 96 Eng. Rep. 525 (K.B. 1773). Shepherd threw a lit squib into a crowded market, where it landed on the table of a gingerbread merchant. A bystander, to protect himself and the gingerbread, threw the squib across the market, where it landed in the goods of another merchant. The merchant grabbed the squib and tossed it away, accidentally hitting a man in the face, putting out one of his eyes.

=== Squibs in films ===
The first documented use of squibs to simulate bullet impacts in cinema was in the 1943 US war-film Bataan.

Other early films using squibs include the 1955 Polish film Pokolenie by Andrzej Wajda, where audiences were presented with a realistic representation of a bullet impacting on an on-camera human being, complete with blood spatter. The creator of the effect, Kazimierz Kutz, used a condom with fake blood and dynamite.

The American western, River of No Return, filmed in 1953 and released in 1954, used a blood squib to simulate realistic bullet-impact in the story's climax, when the story's antagonist is shot dead. As such, this film precedes Run of the Arrow (1957) – often credited with being the first to use blood squibs – by three years, and Pokolenie by one.

=== Origin of the phrase "damp squib" ===
While most modern squibs used by professionals are insulated from moisture, older uninsulated squibs needed to be kept dry in order to ignite, thus a "damp squib" was literally one that failed to perform, a dud, because it got wet. Often misheard as "damp squid", the phrase "damp squib" has since come into general use to mean anything that fails to meet expectations. The word "squib" has come to take on a similar meaning even when used alone, as a diminutive comparison to a full explosive.

== See also ==
- Firecracker – Small explosive meant to produce noise
- Bullet hit squib – Device for simulating a gunshot wound
- Dead-character costume – Stage clothing distressed for stunts
- Pyrotechnics – Science of creating combustibles and explosives for entertainment
- Dud – Ammunition or explosive that fails to fire or detonate
- Firearm malfunction – Failure of a firearm to operate as intended
- Unexploded ordnance – Explosives that have not fully detonated
