= PTC =

PTC may refer to:

== Education ==
- Pacific Theological College, in Suva, Fiji
- Parent-teacher conference
- Pilot Training College, a former organisation in Ireland and the US
- Pittsburgh Technical College, a 2-year college in Pittsburgh, PA, US
- Police Training Centre, Bangladesh
- Portage Trail Conference, an association of public schools in Ohio, US
- Presbyterian Theological College, Victoria, Australia
- RAF Personnel and Training Command, 1994–2007

== Medicine ==
- Papillary thyroid cancer, the most common type of thyroid cancer
- Percutaneous transhepatic cholangiography, an X-ray technique for the biliary tract
- Pseudotumor cerebri or idiopathic intracranial hypertension, a brain disorder

== Organizations ==
- Pacific Telecommunications Council, a telecommunications industry trade association for the Pacific Rim
- Pakistan Telecommunication Company Ltd, KSE code
- Pakistan Tobacco Company
- Partido Trabalhista Cristão (Christian Labour Party), a political party in Brazil
- Partit del Treball de Catalunya (Party of Labour of Catalonia), a communist party in Catalonia, Spain
- Polska Telefonia Cyfrowa, formal name of T-Mobile Polska
- PTC India, an Indian energy trading company
- PTC Punjabi, a television network in India
  - PTC Punjabi (Canada)
  - PTC Punjabi Film Awards
- Public Services, Tax and Commerce Union, UK, 1996–1998
- Public Transport Commission, in New South Wales, Australia
- Public Transport Corporation, in Victoria, Australia
- Public Transport Council, in Singapore
- Radio Television of Serbia (Радио-телевизија Србије), a public broadcaster in Serbia

=== United States ===
- Parents Television Council, a U.S.-based advocacy group
- Pennsylvania Turnpike Commission
- Philadelphia Toboggan Coasters, roller coaster manufacturer, formerly Philadelphia Toboggan Company
- Philadelphia Transportation Company, 1940–1968
- Pioneer Theatre Company, Utah
- a type of patrol boat, for example Patrol torpedo boat PT-41
- PTC Inc., formerly Parametric Technology Corporation, a software company
- PTC Therapeutics, a pharmaceutical company

== Places ==
- Pakuwon Trade Center, a shopping center in Indonesia
- Pitcairn Islands (by ITU country code)
- Punggol MRT/LRT station, Singapore (by LRT code)

== Science and technology ==
- Passive thermal control, a slow roll of a spacecraft on its horizontal axis to stabilize the thermal response to solar heating
- Patched, a protein receptor
- Peptidyl transferase centre, associated with protoribosomes and the possible origin of ribosomes and abiogenesis
- Phase-transfer catalyst, that facilitates interphase migration
- Phenylthiocarbamide, an organosulfur thiourea
- Poly(trimethylene carbonate), a derivative of trimethylene carbonate
- Positive temperature coefficient, of materials which increase resistance with temperature
  - Polymeric positive temperature coefficient (PPTC) device or resettable fuse
  - PTC heating element, a type of self-regulating heater
  - PTC thermistor, a type of resistor
- Positive train control, a type of train protection system
- Potential tropical cyclone, a term used since 2017 in NHC advisory products to describe a disturbance that is not yet a tropical cyclone
- Post-tropical cyclone, an ex-tropical cyclone

== Other uses ==
- Paid to click, payment for viewing advertisements
- Pass-Through Certificates, evidence of ownership of multiple Equipment Trust Certificates
- Piece to camera, spoken directly to a film or TV camera
- Players Tour Championship, in snooker
- Premium Tax Credit, Affordable Care Act provision
- Production tax credit, US, for renewable energy production
