= Energy regulator =

Energy regulator can refer to:

- Energy market regulator: see list of energy regulatory bodies
- Infinite switch, a type of variable electrical heating element
