= Stanley Robert Hart =

Stanley Robert Hart (born 20 June 1935 in Swampscott, Massachusetts) is an American geologist, geochemist, leading international expert on mantle isotope geochemistry, and pioneer of chemical geodynamics.

== Biography ==
Hart graduated from MIT with a bachelor's degree in geology in 1956 and a master's degree in geochemistry in 1957 from Caltech. In 1960 he received his doctorate in geochemistry from MIT with thesis Mineral ages and metamorphism under the supervision of Patrick M. Hurley. After a year as a Carnegie Fellow, Hart was from 1961 to 1975 at the Carnegie Institution in Washington, D.C. in the Department of Terrestrial Magnetism. From 1975 to 1989 he was a professor of Earth, Atmospheric and Planetary Sciences at MIT and from 1989 to 1992 a visiting professor there. From 1989 to 2007 he was a Senior Scientist in geology and geophysics at Woods Hole Oceanographic Institution. He retired from Woods Hole in 2007 as Scientist Emeritus.

Hart is a leading pioneer in the introduction of geochemistry into the Earth sciences. He developed comparative geochronology, which accounts for geological perturbations in various geochronometers. At the Carnegie Institution of Washington, he worked with George Wetherill, George Tilton, L. T. Aldrich, and G. L. Davis on mapping Precambrian rocks in the USA using comparative geochronology. There Hart became the leader of a group including Thomas Krogh, Albrecht Hofmann, Christopher Brooks, and others.

According to Claude Allègre:

Stan has studied basalts in every environment: mid-oceanic ridge basalts, oceanic island basalts, subduction zone basalts, old basalts, Archean basalts. He has also studied basaltic systems in the laboratory, where he was a pioneer in the measurement of partition coefficients for trace elements, but more importantly, he was one of the first to study quantitatively the effect of diffusion and to understand the fundamental problem of how isotopic memories work. His paper with Al Hofmann in the volume honoring Paul Gast is a keystone for geochemistry, isotopic coding with magma, and isotopic memory in solids.

Hart focused on the application of isotopic chemistry to age determination in geology, the geochemical evolution of mantle and oceanic lithosphere, and the geochemistry of strontium, neodymium, and lead isotopes in volcanic rocks. He also studied the long-term behavior of the chemical composition of the oceans due to their interaction with the oceanic crust and the experimental determination of fundamental geochemical properties such as mineral-melt partition coefficients in silicates and solid-state diffusion rates. In 1968, together with John S. Steinhart, he published the Steinhart-Hart equation, which provides a mathematical model of how the temperature and the electrical resistance of a thermistor vary, based upon 3 so-called Steinhart-Hart coefficients.

He was a co-editor from 1970 to 1972 of the Reviews of Geophysics, from 1970 to 1976 of the Geochimica et Cosmochimica Acta, and from 1975 to 1992 of Physics of the Earth and Planetary Interiors. In 1975/76 he chaired the US National Committee for Geochemistry. His doctoral students include Erik Hauri.

Hart has three children, one daughter from his first marriage, which ended in divorce in 1978, and a son and a daughter from his second marriage which began in 1980.

== Awards and honors ==
- 1983 — Member of the National Academy of Sciences
- 1985–1987 — President of the Geochemical Society
- 1992 — V. M. Goldschmidt Award, Geochemical Society
- 1997 — Harry Hess Medal, American Geophysical Union
- 2005 — Fellow of the American Academy of Arts and Sciences
- 2008 — Arthur L. Day Prize and Lectureship
- 2016 — William Bowie Medal

== Selected publications ==
- Brooks, C.; Hart, S. R.; Wendt, I. (1972). "Realistic use of two-error regression treatments as applied to rubidium-strontium data". Reviews of Geophysics. 10 (2): 551. Bibcode:1972RvGSP..10..551B. doi:10.1029/RG010i002p00551.
- White, W. M.; Schilling, J.-G.; Hart, S. R. (1976). "Evidence for the Azores mantle plume from strontium isotope geochemistry of the Central North Atlantic". Nature. 263 (5579): 659–663. Bibcode:1976Natur.263..659W. doi:10.1038/263659a0. S2CID 4271864.
- Hart, Stanley R.; Brooks, Christopher (1977). "The geochemistry and evolution of early precambrian mantle". Contributions to Mineralogy and Petrology. 61 (2): 109–128. Bibcode:1977CoMP...61..109H. doi:10.1007/BF00374362. S2CID 129241768.
- Le Roex, A. P.; Dick, H. J. B.; Erlank, A. J.; Reid, A. M.; Frey, F. A.; Hart, S. R. (1983). "Geochemistry, Mineralogy and Petrogenesis of Lavas Erupted along the Southwest Indian Ridge Between the Bouvet Triple Junction and 11 Degrees East". Journal of Petrology. 24 (3): 267–318. Bibcode:1983JPet...24..267L. doi:10.1093/petrology/24.3.267.
- Le Roex, Anton P.; Dick, Henry J. B.; Reid, Arch M.; Frey, Fred A.; Erlank, Anthony J.; Hart, Stan R. (1985). "Petrology and geochemistry of basalts from the American-Antarctic Ridge, Southern Ocean: Implications for the westward influence of the Bouvet mantle plume". Contributions to Mineralogy and Petrology. 90 (4): 367–380. Bibcode:1985CoMP...90..367L. doi:10.1007/BF00384715. S2CID 140663216.
- Hart, Stanley R.; Zindler, Alan (1986). "In search of a bulk-Earth composition". Chemical Geology. 57 (3–4): 247–267. Bibcode:1986ChGeo..57..247H. doi:10.1016/0009-2541(86)90053-7.
- Hart, S. R.; Staudigel, H. (1989). "Isotopic Characterization and Identification of Recycled Components". Crust/Mantle Recycling at Convergence Zones. pp. 15–28. doi:10.1007/978-94-009-0895-6_2. ISBN 978-94-010-6891-8.
- Hauri, Erik H.; Hart, Stanley R. (1993). "Re Os isotope systematics of HIMU and EMII oceanic island basalts from the south Pacific Ocean". Earth and Planetary Science Letters. 114 (2–3): 353–371. doi:10.1016/0012-821X(93)90036-9.
- Li, Shuguang; Xiao, Yilin; Liou, Deliang; Chen, Yizhi; Ge, Ningjie; Zhang, Zongqing; Sun, Shen-su; Cong, Bolin; Zhang, Ruyuang; Hart, Stanley R.; Wang, Songshan (1993). "Collision of the North China and Yangtse Blocks and formation of coesite-bearing eclogites: Timing and processes". Chemical Geology. 109 (1–4): 89–111. Bibcode:1993ChGeo.109...89L. doi:10.1016/0009-2541(93)90063-O.
- Rhodes, J. M.; Hart, S. R. (1995). "Episodic trace element and isotopic variations in historical Mauna Loa Lavas: Implications for magma and plume dynamics". Mauna Loa Revealed: Structure, Composition, History, and Hazards. Geophysical Monograph Series. Vol. 92. pp. 263–288. doi:10.1029/GM092p0263. ISBN 0-87590-049-6.
- Eiler, John M.; Farley, Kenneth A.; Valley, John W.; Hauri, Erik; Craig, Harmon; Hart, Stanley R.; Stolper, Edward M. (1997). "Oxygen isotope variations in ocean island basalt phenocrysts". Geochimica et Cosmochimica Acta. 61 (11): 2281–2293. Bibcode:1997GeCoA..61.2281E. doi:10.1016/S0016-7037(97)00075-6.
- Workman, R. K.; Hart, S. R.; Jackson, M.; Regelous, M.; Farley, K. A.; Blusztajn, J.; Kurz, M.; Staudigel, H. (2004). "Recycled metasomatized lithosphere as the origin of the Enriched Mantle II (EM2) end-member: Evidence from the Samoan Volcanic Chain". Geochemistry, Geophysics, Geosystems. 5 (4): n/a. Bibcode:2004GGG.....5.4008W. doi:10.1029/2003GC000623. hdl:1912/462. S2CID 13987904.
- Stracke, Andreas; Hofmann, Albrecht W.; Hart, Stan R. (2005). "FOZO, HIMU, and the rest of the mantle zoo" (PDF). Geochemistry, Geophysics, Geosystems. 6 (5): n/a. Bibcode:2005GGG.....6.5007S. doi:10.1029/2004GC000824. hdl:1912/451. S2CID 59354360.
- Allègre, C. J.; Hart, S. R., eds. (2013-10-22). Trace Elements in Igneous Petrology: A Volume in Memory of Paul W. Gast. Elsevier. ISBN 9781483289595.
