= Heating element =

Device that converts electricity into heat

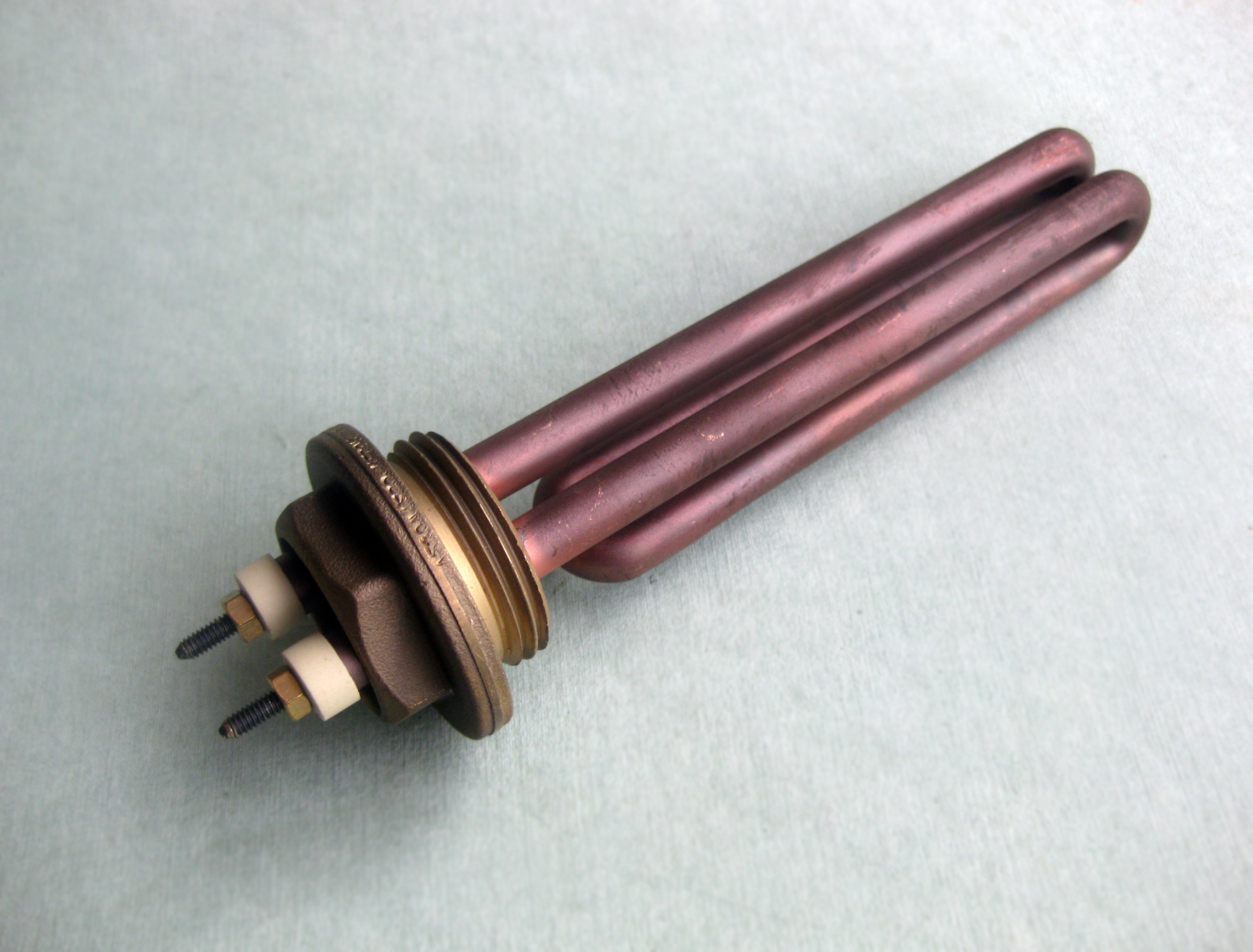
- A folded tubular heating element from an espresso machine
- Component type: Passive
- Working principle: Joule heating

Electronic symbol
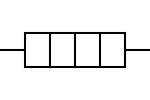
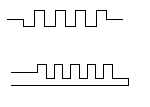

A heating element is a device used to convert electric energy into heat, consisting of a heating resistor and accessories. Heat is generated by the passage of electric current through a resistor through a process known as Joule heating. Heating elements are used in household appliances, industrial equipment, and scientific instruments enabling them to perform tasks such as cooking, warming, or maintaining specific temperatures higher than the ambient.

Heating elements may be used to transfer heat via conduction, convection, or radiation. They are different from devices that generate heat from electrical energy via the Peltier effect, and have no dependence on the direction of electrical current.

== Principles of operation ==
=== Resistance & resistivity ===
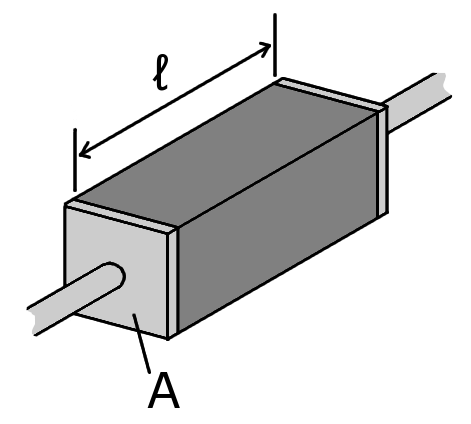
A piece of resistive material with electrical contacts on both ends

Materials used in heating elements have a relatively high electrical resistivity, which is a measure of the material's ability to resist electric current. The electrical resistance that some amount of element material will have is defined by Pouillet's law as
$$R = \rho \frac{\ell}{A}$$
where

- $R$ is the electrical resistance of a uniform specimen of the material
- $\rho$ is the resistivity of the material
- $\ell$ is the length of the specimen
- $A$ is the cross-sectional area of the specimen

The resistance per wire length (Ω/m) of a heating element material is defined in ASTM and DIN standards. In ASTM, wires greater than 0.127 mm in diameter are specified to be held within a tolerance of ±5% Ω/m and for thinner wires ±8% Ω/m.

=== Power density ===
Heating element performance is often quantified by characterizing the power density of the element. Power density is defined as the output power, P, from a heating element divided by the heated surface area, A, of the element. In mathematical terms it is given as:

$\Phi=P/A$

Power density is a measure of heat flux (denoted Φ) and is most often expressed in watts per square millimeter or watts per square inch.

Heating elements with low power density tend to be more expensive but have longer life than heating elements with high power density.

In the United States, power density is often referred to as 'watt density.' It is also sometimes referred to as 'wire surface load.'

== Components ==
=== Resistance heater ===
==== Wire ====
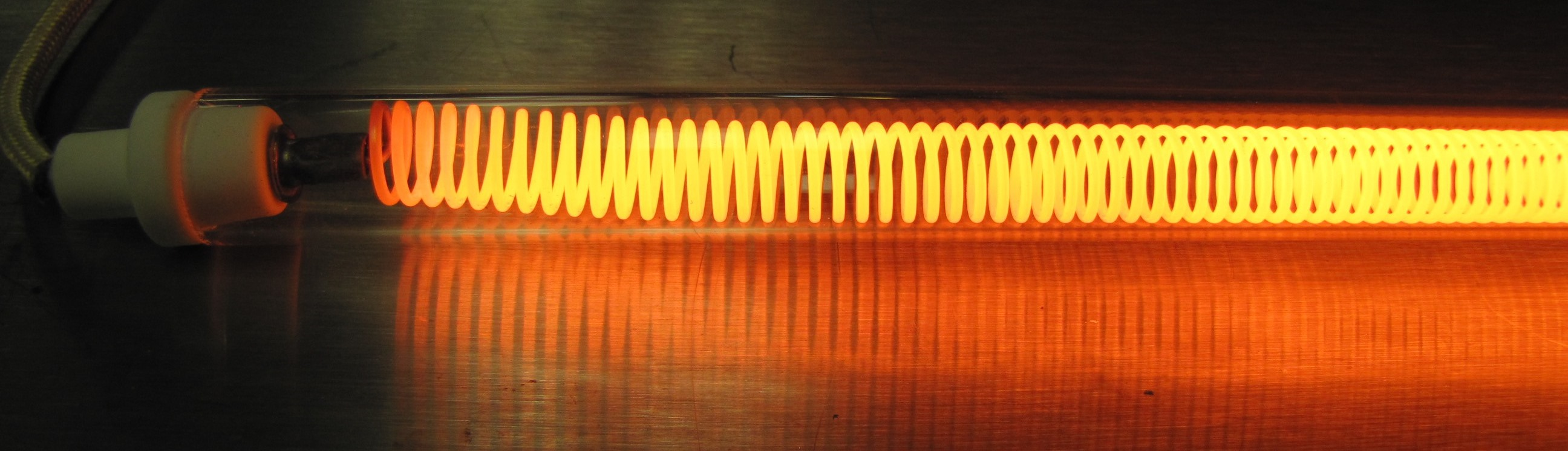
A coiled heating element from an electric toaster

Resistance wires are very long and slender resistors that have a circular cross-section. Like conductive wire, the diameter of resistance wire is often measured with a gauge system, such as American Wire Gauge (AWG). It is possible to use bare exposed wire, for example wrapped around a ceramic core or wrapped around the edge of a mica star-like support structure such as in hair dryers, possibly in coiled or jagged form for higher power density.

==== Ribbon ====
Resistance ribbon heating elements are made by flattening round resistance wire, giving them a rectangular cross-section with rounded corners. Generally ribbon widths are between 0.3 and 4 mm. If a ribbon is wider than that, it is cut out from a broader strip and may instead be called resistance strip. Compared to wire, ribbon can be bent with a tighter radius and can produce heat faster and at a lower cost due to its higher surface area to volume ratio. On the other hand, ribbon life is often shorter than wire life and the price per unit mass of ribbon is generally higher. In many applications such as in toasters, resistance ribbon is wound around a mica card or on one of its sides.

==== Coil ====
Resistance coil is a resistance wire that has a coiled shape. Coils are wound very tightly and then relax to up to 10 times their original length in use. Coils are classified by their diameter and the pitch, or number of coils per unit length.

=== Insulator ===
Heating element insulators serve to electrically and thermally insulate the resistance heater from the environment and foreign objects. Generally for elements that operate higher than 600 °C, ceramic insulators are used. Aluminum oxide, silicon dioxide, and magnesium oxide are compounds commonly used in ceramic heating element insulators. For lower temperatures a wider range of materials are used.

=== Leads ===
Electrical leads serve to connect a heating element to a power source. They generally are made of conductive materials such as copper that do not have as high of a resistance to oxidation as the active resistance material. The leads can be insulated with heat resistant, braided fiberglass.

=== Terminals ===
Heating element terminals serve to isolate the active resistance material from the leads. Terminals are designed to have a lower resistance than the active material by having with a lower resistivity and/or a larger diameter. They may also have a lower oxidation resistance than the active material.

== Types ==
Heating elements are generally classified in one of three frameworks: suspended, embedded, or supported.

- In a suspended design, a resistance heater is attached at two or more points to normally either a ceramic or mica insulator. Suspended resistance heaters can transfer heat via convection and radiation, but not conduction as they are surrounded by air.
- In an embedded heating element, the resistance heater is encased in the insulator. In this framework the heater can only transfer heat via conduction to the insulator.
- Supported heating elements are a combination of the suspended and embedded frameworks. In these assemblies, the resistance heater can transfer heat via conduction, convection, or radiation.

=== Tubes (Calrods) ===
Tubular electric heater.: 1. Resistance heating element; 2. Electrical insulator; 3. Metal casing

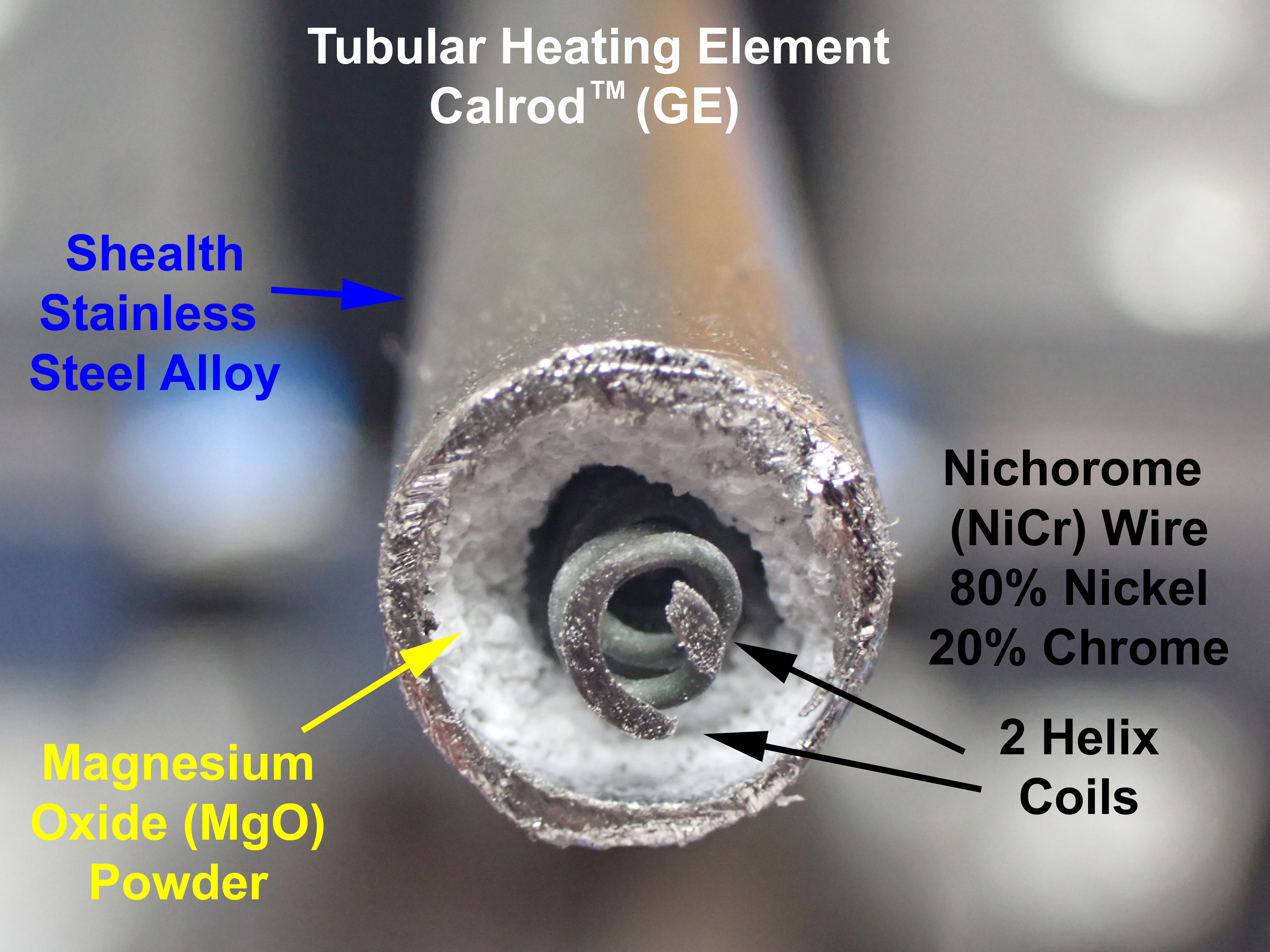
Tubular oven heating element

Tubular or sheathed elements (also referred to by their brand name, Calrods) normally comprise a fine coil of resistance wire surrounded by an electrical insulator and a metallic tube-shaped sheath or casing. Insulation is typically a magnesium oxide powder and the sheath is normally constructed of a copper or steel alloy. To keep moisture out of the hygroscopic insulator, the ends are equipped with beads of insulating material such as ceramic or silicone rubber, or a combination of both. The tube is drawn through a die to compress the powder and maximize heat transmission. These can be a straight rod (as in toaster ovens) or bent to a shape to span an area to be heated (such as in electric stoves, ovens, and coffee makers).

=== Screen-printed elements ===
Screen-printed metal–ceramic tracks deposited on ceramic-insulated metal (generally steel) plates have found widespread application as elements in kettles and other domestic appliances since the mid-1990s.

=== Radiative elements ===
Radiative heating elements (heat lamps) are high-powered incandescent lamps that run at less than maximum power to radiate mostly infrared instead of visible light. These are usually found in radiant space heaters and food warmers, taking either a long, tubular form or an R40 reflector-lamp form. The reflector lamp style is often tinted red to minimize the visible light produced; the tubular form comes in different formats:

- Gold-coated – HeLeN quartz infrared heat lamps as originally patented and manufactured by Philips. A gold dichroic film is deposited on the inside that reduces the visible light and allows most of the short and medium wave infrared through. These tubular quartz lamps are designed for services other than illumination.
- Ruby-coated – Same function as the gold-coated lamps, but at a fraction of the cost. The visible glare is much higher than the gold variant.
- Clear – No coating and mainly used in production processes.

These heaters can also be halogen lamps. They comprise a transparent or translucent quartz exterior, with halogen gas and a tungsten wire. The high temperature of the wire causes it to emit high amounts of infrared radiation which is used as heat for cooking in some household toaster ovens and microwave ovens. They are also used in industrial processes where they are used for radiant heating in ovens such as those used to dry paint in car manufacturing, whereby only the surface being dried is heated and not the air surrounding the workpiece. Their low thermal inertial makes it possible to set the heaters to a low heat output and only increase it when a workpiece is dried, saving energy.

=== Removable ceramic core elements ===
Removable ceramic core elements use a coiled resistance heating alloy wire threaded through one or more cylindrical ceramic segments to make a required length (related to output), with or without a center rod. Inserted into a metal sheath or tube sealed at one end, this type of element allows replacement or repair without breaking into the process involved, usually fluid heating under pressure.

=== Etched foil elements ===
Etched foil elements are generally made from the same alloys as resistance wire elements, but are produced with a subtractive photo-etching process that starts with a continuous sheet of metal foil and ends with a complex resistance pattern. These elements are commonly found in precision heating applications like medical diagnostics and aerospace.

=== Polymer PTC heating elements ===
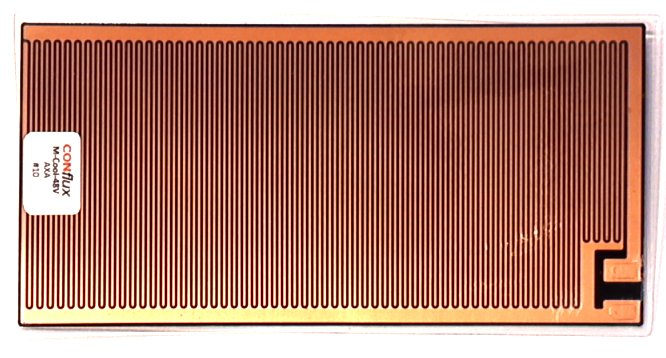
A flexible PTC heater made of conductive rubber

Resistive heaters can be made of conducting PTC rubber materials where the resistivity increases exponentially with increasing temperature. Such a heater will produce high power when it is cold, and rapidly heat itself to a constant temperature. Due to the exponentially increasing resistivity, the heater can never heat itself to warmer than this temperature. Above this temperature, the rubber acts as an electrical insulator. The temperature can be chosen during the production of the rubber. Typical temperatures are between 0 and 80 °C (32 and 176 °F).

It is a point-wise self-regulating and self-limiting heater. Self-regulating means that every point of the heater independently keeps a constant temperature without the need of regulating electronics. Self-limiting means that the heater can never exceed a certain temperature in any point and requires no overheat protection.

=== Thick-film heaters ===
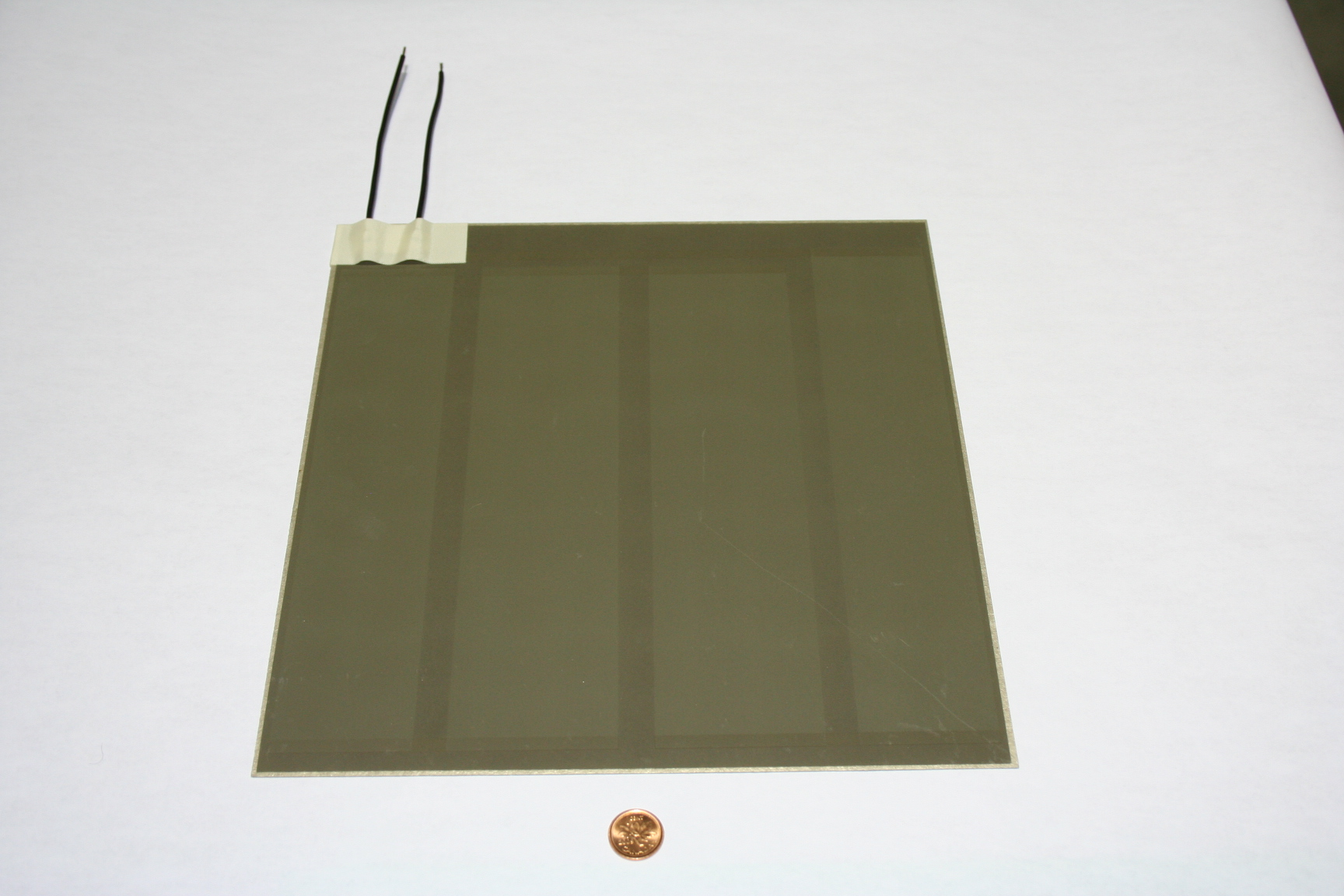
A thick-film heater printed on a mica sheet

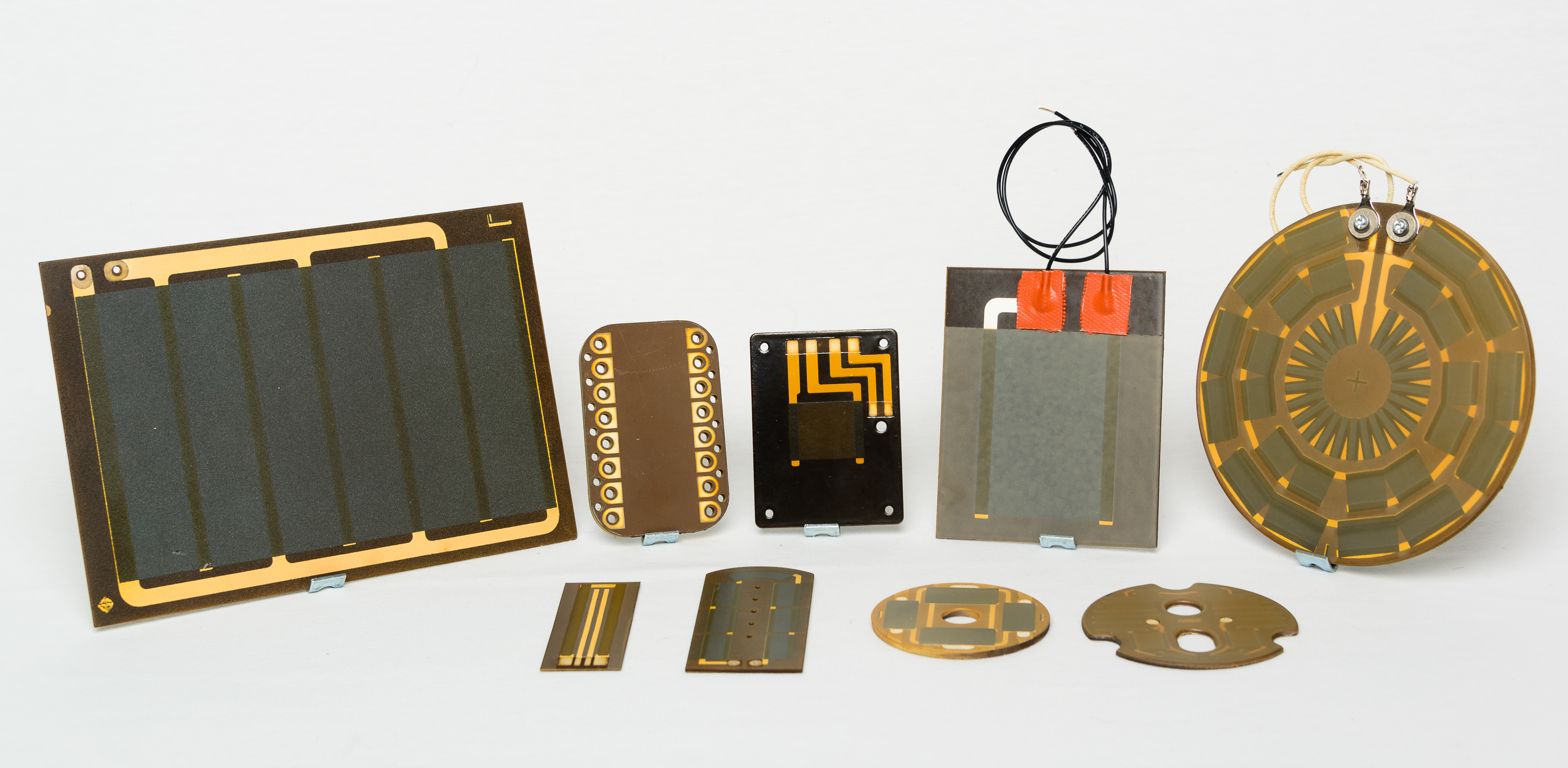
Thick-film heaters printed on a metal substrate

Thick-film heaters are a type of resistive heater that can be printed on a thin substrate. Thick-film heaters exhibit various advantages over the conventional metal-sheathed resistance elements. In general, thick-film elements are characterized by their low-profile form factor, improved temperature uniformity, quick thermal response due to low thermal mass, high energy density, and wide range of voltage compatibility. Typically, thick-film heaters are printed on flat substrates, as well as on tubes in different heater patterns. These heaters can attain power densities of as high as 100 W/cm^{2} depending on the heat transfer conditions. The thick-film heater patterns are highly customizable based on the sheet resistance of the printed resistor paste.

These heaters can be printed on a variety of substrates including metal, ceramic, glass, and polymer using metal- or alloy-loaded thick-film pastes. The most common substrates used to print thick-film heaters are aluminum 6061-T6, stainless steel, and muscovite or phlogopite mica sheets. The applications and operational characteristics of these heaters vary widely based on the chosen substrate materials. This is primarily attributed to the thermal characteristics of the substrates.

There are several conventional applications of thick-film heaters. They can be used in griddles, waffle irons, stove-top electric heating, humidifiers, tea kettles, heat sealing devices, water heaters, clothes irons and steamers, hair straighteners, boilers, heated beds of 3D printers, thermal print heads, glue guns, laboratory heating equipment, clothes dryers, baseboard heaters, warming trays, heat exchangers, deicing and defogging devices for car windshields, side mirrors, refrigerator defrosting, etc.

For most applications, the thermal performance and temperature distribution are the two key design parameters. In order to maintain a uniform temperature distribution across a substrate, the circuit design can be optimized by changing the localized power density of the resistor circuit. An optimized heater design helps to control the heating power and modulate the local temperatures across the heater substrate. In cases where there is a requirement of two or more heating zones with different power densities over a relatively small area, a thick-film heater can be designed to achieve a zonal heating pattern on a single substrate.

Thick-film heaters can largely be characterized under two subcategories – negative-temperature-coefficient (NTC) and positive-temperature-coefficient (PTC) materials – based on the effect of temperature changes on the element's resistance. NTC-type heaters are characterized by a decrease in resistance as the heater temperature increases and thus have a higher power at higher temperatures for a given input voltage. PTC heaters behave in an opposite manner with an increase of resistance and decreasing heater power at elevated temperatures. This characteristic of PTC heaters makes them self-regulating, as their power stabilizes at fixed temperatures. On the other hand, NTC-type heaters generally require a thermostat or a thermocouple in order to control the heater runaway. These heaters are used in applications which require a quick ramp-up of heater temperature to a predetermined set-point as they are usually faster-acting than PTC-type heaters.

=== Liquid ===
An electrode boiler uses electricity flowing through streams of water to create steam via resistance heating of the water itself. Operating voltages are typically between 240 and 600 volts, single or three-phase AC. Similarly, arc furnaces use electrodes to pass electric current though a material such as metal or glass to heat it via resistance heating.

=== Laser heaters ===
Laser heaters are heating elements used for achieving very high temperatures.

== Materials ==
Materials used in heating elements are selected for a variety of mechanical, thermal, and electrical properties. Due to the wide range of operating temperatures that these elements withstand, temperature dependencies of material properties are a common consideration.

=== Metal alloys ===
Resistance heating alloys are metals that can be used for electrical heating purposes above 600 °C in air. They can be distinguished from resistance alloys which are used primarily for resistors operating below 600 °C.

While the majority of atoms in these alloys correspond to the ones listed in their name, they also consist of trace elements. Trace elements play an important role in resistance alloys, as they have a substantial influence on mechanical properties such as work-ability, form stability, and oxidation life. Some of these trace elements may be present in the basic raw materials, while others may be added deliberately to improve the performance of the material. The terms contaminates and enhancements are used to classify trace elements. Contaminates typically have undesirable effects such as decreased life and limited temperature range. Enhancements are intentionally added by the manufacturer and may provide improvements such as increased oxide layer adhesion, greater ability to hold shape, or longer life at higher temperatures.

The most common alloys used in heating elements include:

==== Ni-Cr(Fe) alloys (AKA nichrome, Chromel) ====
Ni-Cr(Fe) resistance heating alloys, also known as nichrome or Chromel, are described by both ASTM and DIN standards. These standards specify the relative percentages of nickel and chromium that should be present in an alloy. In ASTM three alloys that are specified contain, amongst other trace elements:

- 80% Ni, 20% Cr
- 60% Ni, 16% Cr
- 35% Ni, 20% Cr

Nichrome 80/20 is one of the most commonly used resistance heating alloys because it has relatively high resistance and forms an adherent layer of chromium oxide when it is heated for the first time. Material beneath this layer will not oxidize, preventing the wire from breaking or burning out.

==== Fe-Cr-Al alloys (AKA Kanthal®) ====
Fe-Cr-Al resistance heating alloys, also known as Kanthal®, are described by an ASTM standard. Manufacturers may opt to use this class of alloys as opposed to Ni-Cr(Fe) alloys to avoid the typically relatively higher cost of nickel as a raw material compared to aluminum. The tradeoff is that Fe-Cr-Al alloys are more brittle and less ductile than Ni-Cr(Fe) ones, making them more delicate and prone to failure.

On the other hand, the aluminum oxide layer that forms on the surface of Fe-Cr-Al alloys is more thermodynamically stable than the chromium oxide layer that tends to form on Ni-Cr(Fe), making Fe-Cr-Al better at resisting corrosion. However, humidity may be more detrimental to the wire life of Fe-Cr-Al than Ni-Cr(Fe).

Fe-Cr-Al alloys, like stainless steels, tend to undergo embrittlement at room temperature after being heated in the temperature range of 400 to 575 °C for an extended duration.

==== Other alloys ====
- Cu-Ni alloys (cupronickel): Used for low temperature heating
- Heating elements for high-temperature furnaces are often made of exotic materials, including platinum, tungsten disilicide/molybdenum disilicide, and molybdenum (vacuum furnaces).

=== Ceramics & semiconductors ===
- Molybdenum disilicide (MoSi_{2}) an inter-metallic compound, a silicide of molybdenum, is a refractory ceramic primarily used in heating elements. It has moderate density, melting point 2030 °C (3686 °F) and is electrically conductive. At high temperatures it forms a passivation layer of silicon dioxide, protecting it from further oxidation. The application area includes glass industry, ceramic sintering, heat treatment furnaces and semiconductor diffusion furnaces where graphite can also be used.
- Silicon carbide, is used in hot surface igniters, which are heating elements designed for igniting flammable gas, are common in gas ovens and clothes dryers.
- Silicon nitride has been recently used as a surface igniter for gas furnace and diesel engine glow plugs. Such heating elements or glow plugs reach a maximum temperature of 1400 °C and quickly ignite gasoline or kerosene. The material is also used in diesel and spark ignited engines for other combustion components and wear parts.
- PTC ceramic elements: PTC ceramic materials are named for their positive thermal coefficient of resistance (i.e., resistance increases upon heating). While most ceramics have a negative coefficient, these materials (often barium titanate and lead titanate composites) have a highly nonlinear thermal response, so that above a composition-dependent threshold temperature their resistance increases rapidly. This behavior causes the material to act as a self-regulating heater, since current passes when it is cool, and does not when it is hot. Thin films of this material are used in heating garments, in automotive rear-window defrost heaters, and honeycomb-shaped elements are used in more expensive hair dryers, space heaters and most modern pellet stoves. Such heating elements can reach temperatures of 950–1000 °C and can reach equilibrium quickly.
- Quartz halogen infrared heaters are also used to provide radiant heating.

== Applications ==
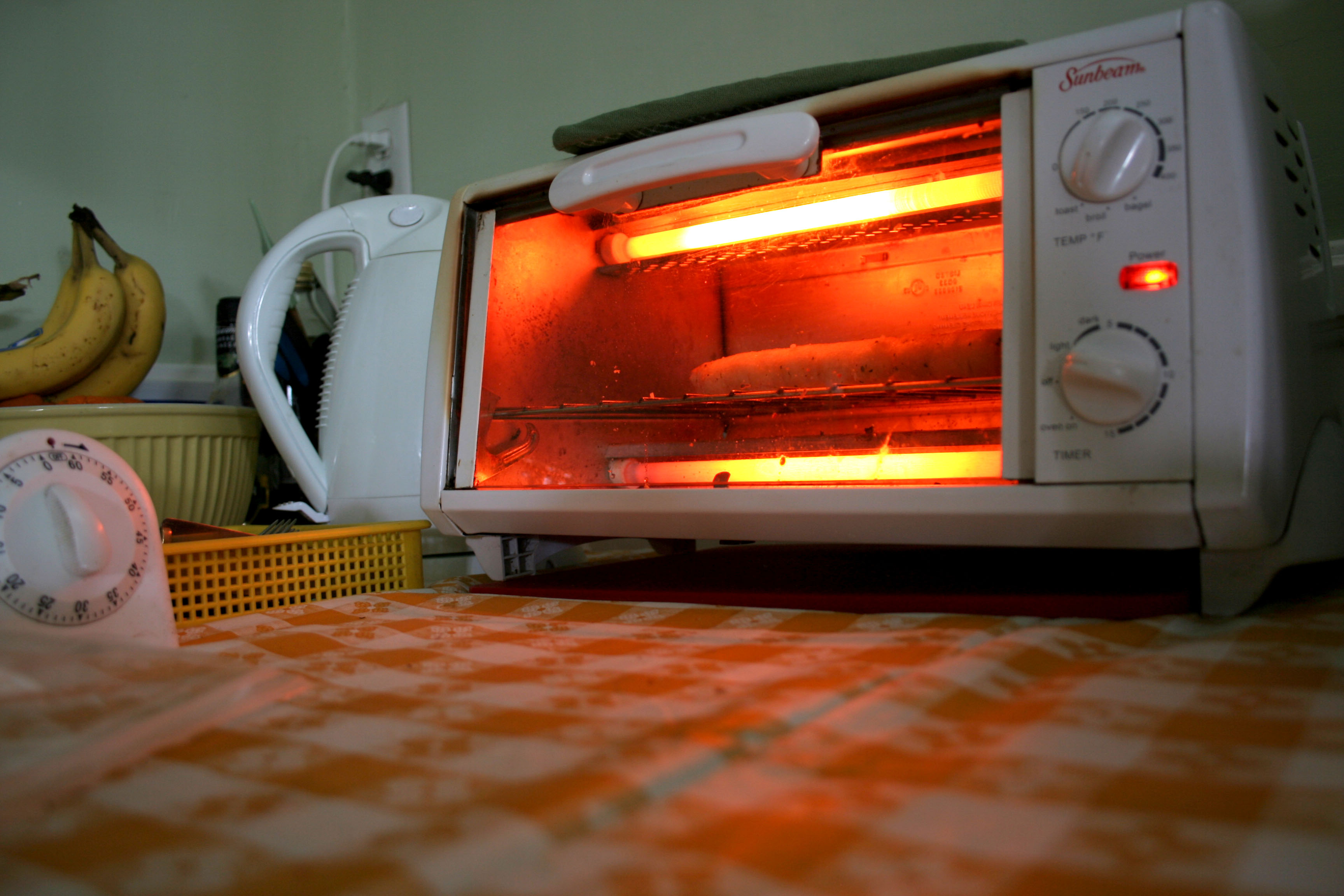
Toaster with red hot heating elements

Heating elements find application in a wide range of domestic, commercial, and industrial settings:

- Home Appliances: Common household appliances such as ovens, toasters, electric stoves, water heaters, and space heaters rely on heating elements to generate the necessary heat for their functions.
- Industrial Processes: In industries, heating elements are integral to processes such as metal smelting, plastic molding, and chemical reactions that require controlled temperatures.
- Scientific Instruments: Laboratories use heating elements in various equipment, including incubators, furnaces, and analytical instruments.
- Automotive Industry: Heating elements are utilized in vehicles for applications like heated seats, rear window defrosters, and engine block heaters.

== Life cycle ==
The life of a heating element specifies how long it is expected to last in an application. Generally heating elements in a domestic appliance will be rated for between 500 and 5000 hours of use, depending on the type of product and how it is used.

A thinner wire or ribbon will always have a shorter life than a thicker one at the same temperature.

Standardized life tests for resistance heating materials are described by ASTM International. Accelerated life tests for Ni-Cr(Fe) alloys and Fe-Cr-Al alloys intended for electrical heating are used to measure the cyclic oxidation resistance of materials.

== Packaging ==
Resistance wire and ribbon are most often shipped wound around spools. Generally the thinner the wire, the smaller the spool. In some cases pail packs or rings may be used instead of spools.

== Safety ==
General safety requirements for heating elements used in household appliances are defined by the International Electrotechnical Commission (IEC). The standard specifies limits for parameters such as insulation strength, creepage distance, and leakage current. It also provides tolerances on the rating of a heating element.

== See also ==
- Ceramic heater
- Heated hose
- Heating mantle
- Positive temperature coefficient
- Resistive loads
- Thermoelectric effect
