= Hose =

Flexible hollow tube to carry fluids

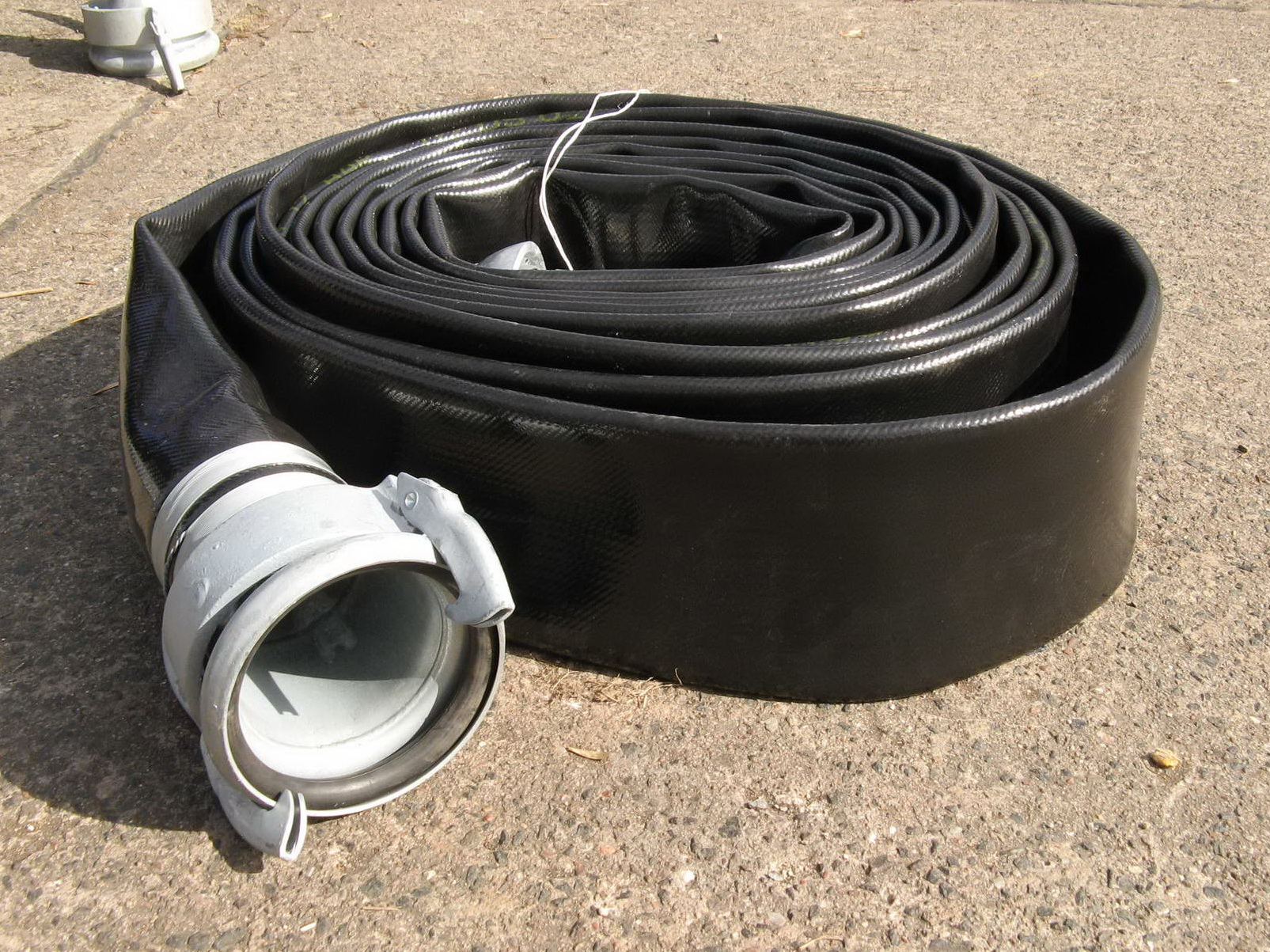
A modern water hose

A hose, also called a hose-pipe, is a flexible hollow tube or pipe designed to carry fluids from one location to another, often from a faucet or hydrant.

Early hoses were made of leather, flax, and cotton. World War II lead to increased industrial development and the invention of synthetic rubber materials with higher chemical resistance. Modern hoses may be made of rubber, canvas, and helically wound wire. Hoses may also be made from plastics such as polyvinyl chloride and polytetrafluoroethylene. Materials such as stainless steel and polyethylene terephthalate are used for hoses capable of carrying low-temperature liquids such as liquid oxygen and liquid nitrogen.

== See also ==
- Hose coupling – Connector on the end of a hose
- Heated hose
- Garden hose
