= Heated hose =

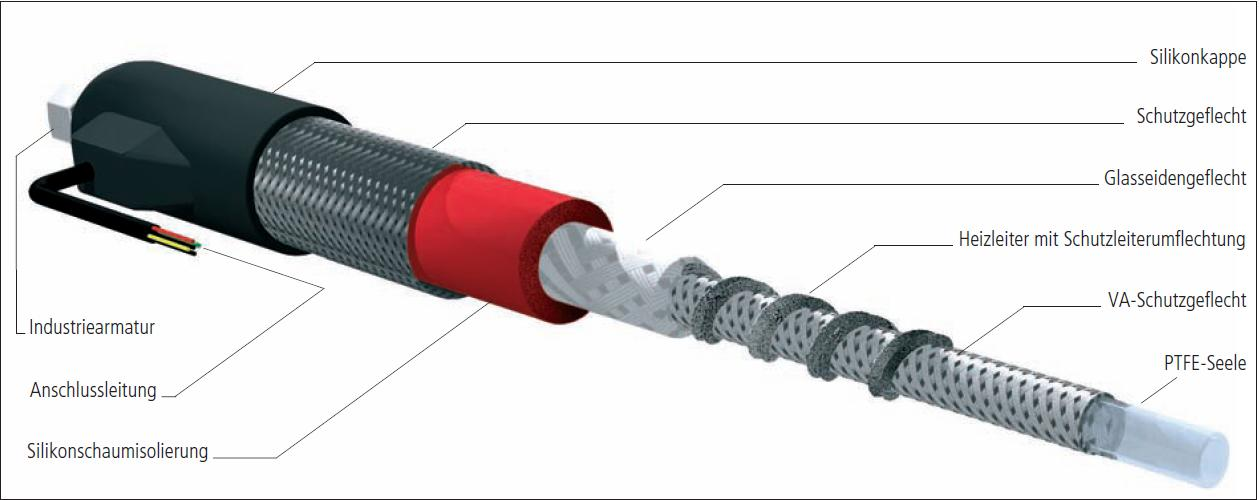
Heated hose assembly

Heated hoses are hoses used for transporting liquids or molten materials where integral heat is needed for temperature control. Heated hoses are suitable for environments from -40°C to 80°C and can be used in explosion-proof zones 1/21 and 2/22, if required. Heated hose are generally specified by required inside diameter, working pressure, operating conditions, voltage, temperature sensor and hose fitting.

== Usage ==
Heated hoses are used in bonding technology, filling and dosing systems, medical technology, chemical, pharmaceutical and food industry, extruder applications, and research & development. The heated hoses are used wherever a liquid, viscous or melted medium has to be transported from one place to another, e.g. chocolate, jelly or hotmelt. In most applications, the temperature of the medium needs to remain constant at a specified value irrespective of variations in ambient temperature. Several constructions are available.

== Overview ==
A heated hose consists of a flexible hose, through which the media is pumped. This hose determines the resistance against temperature and chemicals. A heating element is wrapped on the hose and then it is covered with insulation material. Possible insulation materials are Polyamid, steel wire or silicone. The heating element contains a heat sensor. Fittings and fixtures can vary with the application.

Heated hoses are now available for use around the home and farm. Commonly used on farms to get water to livestock in northern climates during the winter.

== See also ==
- Heating element
