= Macedonite =

General
- Category: Minerals
- Formula: PbTiO_{3}
- IMA symbol: Mce
- Strunz classification: 4.CC.35
- Dana classification: 4.3.6.1
- Crystal system: Tetragonal
- Space group: P4/nmm
- Unit cell: a = 3.90 Å, c = 4.18 Å Z=1 V=63.58 Å^{3}

Structure

Identification
- Colour: black
- Tenacity: very brittle
- Mohs scale hardness: 6
- Luster: vitreous
- Diaphaneity: opaque
- Specific gravity: 7.82
- Optical properties: Uniaxial

Macedonite is a mineral named by Radusinović and Markov in 1971. It has the elemental formula PbTiO3 and exhibits tetragonal crystal system. The type locality is near Crni Kamen, Selecka Planina, Prilep Municipality, North Macedonia. It can be confused with perovskite. It is found in an amazonite-rich area.

== Fame ==
Lead titanate, which is the premier piezoelectric material, had not been previously reported in the wild.
