= Self-regulating heater =

Type of resistive heater

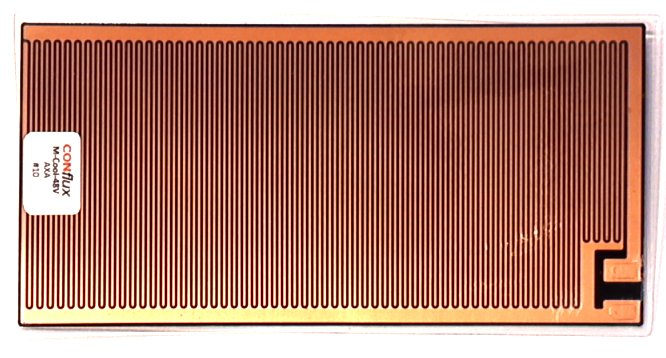
A flexible PTC heater made of conductive rubber

Electronic circuit symbol for a PTC resistor

A positive-temperature-coefficient heating element, also called a PTC heating element or self-regulating heater, is an electrical resistance heater whose resistance increases significantly with temperature. The name self-regulating heater comes from the tendency of such heating elements to maintain a constant temperature when supplied by a given voltage.

PTC heating elements are a type of thermistor.

== Properties ==
PTC heating elements have large positive temperature coefficients of resistance, which means if a constant voltage is applied, the element produces a large amount of heat when its temperature is low, and a smaller amount of heat when its temperature is high. In comparison, most electrical heating elements also have positive temperature coefficients, but those coefficients are so small that the elements produce approximately the same amount of heat regardless of temperature.

=== Self-regulating ===
Some PTC heating elements are designed to have a sharp change in resistance at a particular temperature. These elements are called self-regulating because they tend to maintain that temperature even if the applied voltage or heat load changes. Below that temperature, the element produces a large amount of heating power, which tends to raise the temperature of the heating element. Above that temperature, the element produces little heating power, which tends to allow it to cool.

In some applications, this self-regulating characteristic allows PTC heaters to be used without thermostats or overtemperature protection circuits. One very important use of self-regulating heating elements is to assure the heating element will not become so hot as to damage itself or other parts of the heater. In some applications where the heating element is directly connected to the item being heated a self-regulating heater may also provide adequate temperature control of the item to be heated.

However, many applications require control of two temperatures. For example, space heaters use heating elements much hotter than the room being heated. In these applications, a thermostat may be better able to sense and control the temperature of the item being heated. Nevertheless, a self-regulating heating element may still be used to keep the heating element from damaging itself or other parts of the heater.

=== Fast warm-up ===
If the heat required to hold the desired temperature is known, a PTC heating element can be selected to provide the correct amount of heat at the desired temperature. Such a heating element will warm up quickly because it produces more heat at low temperatures. In contrast, a conventional heating element that produces the correct amount of heat at the desired temperature will produce the same amount of heat at low temperature, resulting in long warm-up times.

=== Adjustable heat output ===
In some applications it is desirable to regulate the heat output (typically measured in watts) as opposed to regulating the temperature. The heat output of any electrical heating element can be regulated by regulating the electrical power input. PTC heating elements also can be regulated indirectly. For example, a PTC heating element with a sharp change in resistance at a particular temperature can be fitted with a constant voltage source and a variable-speed fan. With the fan at a low setting, the heating element draws only a small amount of current, resulting in a low heat output. With the fan at a high setting, the air draws away more heat, and the heating element responds by producing more heat.

=== Adjustable temperature ===
If being able to adjust the temperature is more important than holding a fixed temperature, then a PTC material whose resistance changes smoothly with temperature can be used. The temperature such a material tends to hold can be adjusted by changing the voltage applied.

=== More shapes of heating elements feasible ===
PTC heating elements can be made in more shapes than conventional heating elements. Conventional heating elements are constrained to be long and thin (often coiled to save space) to prevent current hogging. If the element was made thick or irregular in shape, then there would be more than one path for the electrical current. The path with the least resistance would tend to heat more than the rest of the element. In severe cases, this would cause a cascading failure where the path of least resistance overheats and fails, redirecting the current to other parts of the element, leading them also to overheat and fail.

PTC elements can be built thick or irregularly shaped, because if one path through the element heats more than the rest, the resistance of the path will increase, redirecting the electrical current without overheating.

One application of a specially shaped heating element is to increase the surface area of the heating element. A large surface area means the element can operate at a lower temperature and still deliver a large amount of heat. The lower temperature may make a heater safer. However, other safety measures can assure the safety of conventional heaters.

Another application of a specially shaped heating element is to closely match the shape of the item being heated, which helps assure the object is maintained close to the same temperature of the heating element.

== PTC materials ==
Positive temperature coefficient heating elements can be made of several materials.

=== Ceramic type ===
Although the most commonly available ceramic materials are electrical insulators, some conduct electricity with a positive temperature coefficient. Such PTC ceramic heating elements are often called "stones".

=== Polymer ===
Some polymers are suitable as PTC heating materials. These have the useful property that they can be made in the form of inks. Heating elements of complex shape can be easily manufactured using printing techniques. If the inks are printed onto a flexible substrate, then the whole heating element can be flexible.

One type of polymer is a PTC rubber, which is a type of silicone rubber.

== Operation ==
Since PTC heating elements are a kind of thermistor, they share the same principles of operation. The details depend on the type of material, but a class of materials widely used are crystalline ceramics. During manufacture, dopants are added to give the material semiconductor properties. These materials have somewhat negative temperature coefficients at low temperatures and at high temperatures, however there is a temperature range in between where they have useful positive temperature coefficients. These materials have a critical temperature where the resistivity changes quite markedly. This temperature is called the Curie temperature because the material's magnetic properties also change markedly.

The temperature coefficient of a PTC heating element generally is a function of temperature. The Steinhart–Hart equation is often used to approximate this function. In some applications where the heater is used only in a narrow temperature range, a simple linear equation may be adequate.
