= Steinhart–Hart equation =

Semiconductor resistance model

The Steinhart–Hart equation is a model relating the varying electrical resistance of a semiconductor to its varying temperatures. The equation is

$$\frac{1}{T} = A + B \ln R + C (\ln R)^3,$$

where

$T$ is the temperature (in kelvins),
$R$ is the resistance at $T$ (in ohms),
$A$, $B$, and $C$ are the Steinhart–Hart coefficients, which are characteristics specific to the bulk semiconductor material over a given temperature range of interest.

== Application ==
When applying a thermistor device to measure temperature, the equation relates a measured resistance to the device temperature, or vice versa.

=== Finding temperature from resistance and characteristics ===
The equation model converts the resistance actually measured in a thermistor to its theoretical bulk temperature, with a closer approximation to actual temperature than simpler models, and valid over the entire working temperature range of the sensor. Steinhart–Hart coefficients for specific commercial devices are ordinarily reported by thermistor manufacturers as part of the device characteristics.

=== Finding characteristics from measurements of resistance at known temperatures ===
Conversely, when the three Steinhart–Hart coefficients of a specimen device are not known, they can be derived experimentally by a curve fitting procedure applied to three measurements at various known temperatures. Given the three temperature-resistance observations, the coefficients are solved from three simultaneous equations.

== Inverse of the equation ==
To find the resistance of a semiconductor at a given temperature, the inverse of the Steinhart–Hart equation must be used. See the Application Note, "A, B, C Coefficients for Steinhart–Hart Equation".

$$R = \exp\left(\sqrt[3]{y - x/2} - \sqrt[3]{y + x/2}\right),$$

where

$$\begin{align}
x &= \frac{1}{C}\left(A - \frac{1}{T}\right), \\
y &= \sqrt{\left(\frac{B}{3C}\right)^3 + \frac{x^2}{4}}.
\end{align}$$

== Steinhart–Hart coefficients ==
To find the coefficients of Steinhart–Hart, we need to know at-least three operating points. For this, we use three values of resistance data for three known temperatures.

$$\begin{bmatrix}
1 & \ln R_1 & \ln^3 R_1 \\
1 & \ln R_2 & \ln^3 R_2 \\
1 & \ln R_3 & \ln^3 R_3
\end{bmatrix}\begin{bmatrix}
A \\
B \\
C
\end{bmatrix} = \begin{bmatrix}
\frac{1}{T_1} \\
\frac{1}{T_2} \\
\frac{1}{T_3}
\end{bmatrix}$$

With $R_1$, $R_2$ and $R_3$ values of resistance at the temperatures $T_1$, $T_2$ and $T_3$, one can express $A$, $B$ and $C$ (all calculations):

$$\begin{align}
L_1 &= \ln R_1, \quad L_2 = \ln R_2, \quad L_3 = \ln R_3 \\
Y_1 &= \frac{1}{T_1}, \quad Y_2 = \frac{1}{T_2}, \quad Y_3 = \frac{1}{T_3} \\
\gamma_2 &= \frac{Y_2 - Y_1}{L_2 - L_1}, \quad \gamma_3 = \frac{Y_3 - Y_1}{L_3 - L_1} \\
\Rightarrow C &= \left( \frac{ \gamma_3 - \gamma_2 }{ L_3 - L_2} \right) \left(L_1 + L_2 + L_3\right)^{-1} \\
\Rightarrow B &= \gamma_2 - C \left(L_1^2 + L_1 L_2 + L_2^2\right) \\
\Rightarrow A &= Y_1 - \left(B + L_1^2 C\right) L_1
\end{align}$$

== History ==
The equation was developed by John S. Steinhart and Stanley R. Hart, who first published it in 1968.

== Derivation and alternatives ==
The most general form of the equation can be derived from extending the B parameter equation to an infinite series:

$$R = R_0 e^{B\left(\frac{1}{T} - \frac{1}{T_0}\right)}$$
$$\frac{1}{T} = \frac{1}{T_0} + \frac{1}{B} \left(\ln \frac{R}{R_0}\right) = a_0 + a_1 \ln \frac{R}{R_0}$$
$$\frac{1}{T} = \sum_{n=0}^\infty a_n \left(\ln \frac{R}{R_0}\right)^n$$

$R_0$ is a reference (standard) resistance value. The Steinhart–Hart equation assumes $R_0$ is 1 ohm. The curve fit is much less accurate when it is assumed $a_2=0$ and a different value of $R_0$ such as 1 kΩ is used. However, using the full set of coefficients avoids this problem as it simply results in shifted parameters.

In the original paper, Steinhart and Hart remark that allowing $a_2 \neq 0$ degraded the fit. This is surprising as allowing more freedom would usually improve the fit. It may be because the authors fitted $1/T$ instead of $T$, and thus the error in $T$ increased from the extra freedom. Subsequent papers have found great benefit in allowing $a_2 \neq 0$.

The equation was developed through trial-and-error testing of numerous equations, and selected due to its simple form and good fit. However, in its original form, the Steinhart–Hart equation is not sufficiently accurate for modern scientific measurements. For interpolation using a small number of measurements, the series expansion with $n=4$ has been found to be accurate within 1 mK over the calibrated range. Some authors recommend using $n=5$. If there are many data points, standard polynomial regression can also generate accurate curve fits. Some manufacturers have begun providing regression coefficients as an alternative to Steinhart–Hart coefficients.
