= Infinite switch =

Variable power heating element controller

An infinite switch, simmerstat, energy regulator or infinite controller is a type of switch that allows variable power output of a heating element of an electric stove. It is called "infinite" because its average output is infinitely variable rather than being limited to a few switched levels. It uses a bi-metallic strip conductive connection across terminals that disconnects with increased temperature. As current passes through the bimetal connection, it will heat and deform, breaking the connection and turning off the power. After a short time, the bimetal will cool and reconnect. Infinite switches vary the average power delivered to a device by switching frequently between on and off states. They may be used for situations that are not sensitive to such changes, such as the resistive heating elements in electric stoves and kilns.

== History ==
An early switch operating by this principle was invented by Chester I. Hall of the General Electric Company, with a patent filed in 1921 and approved in 1924. Like the modern infinite switch, Hall's invention used a bi-metallic strip, heated by a constant current, to break a connection after a given period of time. It also used a rotatable cam attached to a knob to control duration. However, unlike its successors, Hall's invention was not self-resetting and would only stay on for a single cycle, after which a manual reset button could be pressed. According to the patent, the intended use was to control the timing of exposures in medical radiography.

The infinite switch itself was described in a 1975 patent of George F. Esker Jr. and Otto J. Cousins of the Harper Wyman Company. This switch would reset itself as the bi-metallic strip cooled, provided a cycle of calibrated opening and closing. It also provided an indicator light that remained on as long as the knob was not in the closed position. This switch was designed for use in electric stoves.

== Technical details ==
A rotary hand control turns a shaft that is connected within the infinite switch to a cam and follower. At the off position both power line connections are interrupted. At all on positions the manual contacts connect one of the line terminals to the pilot lamp terminal and one of the terminals for the heating element being controlled. At the maximum heat position the cam follower applies sufficient force for the cycling contacts to remain closed at all times. At the other positions the cam follower applies less force allowing the cycling contacts to cycle. Initially, the cycling contacts close in all positions and a permanent magnet pulls them to remain closed. One of the two cycling contacts energizes the controlled heating element and the other energizes a very small electric heating element attached to a bimetallic strip. The force from the heated bimetallic strip increases as its temperature rises until it overcomes the combined force from the cam follower, an unheated bimetallic strip that compensates for ambient temperature, and the permanent magnet allowing the cycling contacts open which interrupts the electric current to both heating elements. Both the bimetallic strip and the "burner" begin to cool. Eventually the heated bimetallic strip will no longer have enough force to overcome the force from the cam follower and the unheated bimetallic strip. As the contacts approach each other the permanent magnet attracts the contact beam rapidly closing the contacts and the cycle repeats.

Controls for domestic cooking generally have a 5% on time at the minimum setting. Controls for commercial cooking generally have a 22.5% on time at the minimum setting. Controls for warming trays, kilns and other applications may have a higher minimum setting to provide fine control over a range useful for the application.

An important variation of the control is the series or current sensitive type as opposed to the parallel or voltage sensitive type. The difference between the types is whether the internal heater within the infinite switch becomes connected in series with the controlled heating element, that is to one power line terminal and the controlled heating element terminal or it becomes connected to the two power line terminals. The preceding discussion referring to two cycling contacts presumes the parallel or voltage sensitive type. The current sensitive type has the effect of compensating the control for the temperature of the controlled heating element because the resistance of nickel chromium heating elements changes significantly with temperature. When cool the heating element has a lower resistance and dissipates more power than it does when hot. This has the effect of shrinking the range of power delivered by the voltage sensitive type when the heating element is cooled, by a vessel containing water for example. The current sensitive type makes it easier to control the rate at which a pot boils. The current sensitive type is specific to nominal current of the heating element being controlled and can't be used for applications that allow the power rating of the heating element to be changed for different cooking tasks.

== Alternatives and similar devices ==
Disadvantages of frequently cycled mechanical contacts may include erosion of the switch contacts if the contacts move slowly by design or due to contamination so that power from electrical arcing between closely spaced contacts has time to accumulate and overheat or melt the contact surface. Operating the device contacts at low current to control a relay to preserve the contacts from thermal damage causes rapid failure as condensed volatile organic compounds, more familiarly known as kitchen grease, accumulate and insulate the contacts. The pulse of radio frequency noise emitted by any electrical arc is contained within the metal enclosure required for a safe design in the event of a component or wire insulation failure. The mechanical contact infinite switch is unsuitable for resistive loads more than 15 A at 240 V or 3.6 kW. The contacts have a reduced operating life when used for inductive loads like electric motors or induction heating.

The infinite switch is comparable to a slow pulse-width modulation device, but both the duty cycle and the cycle rate vary. The device is also conceptually similar to a bimetallic switching thermostat, except that the infinite switch responds to the temperature of its internal heater as a model for the temperature of the "burner" being controlled instead of sensing the temperature being controlled directly.

== See also ==
- Bimetal thermostat
- Relaxation oscillator
- Dimmer
