= Electric stove =

Stove with an integrated electrical heating device to cook and bake

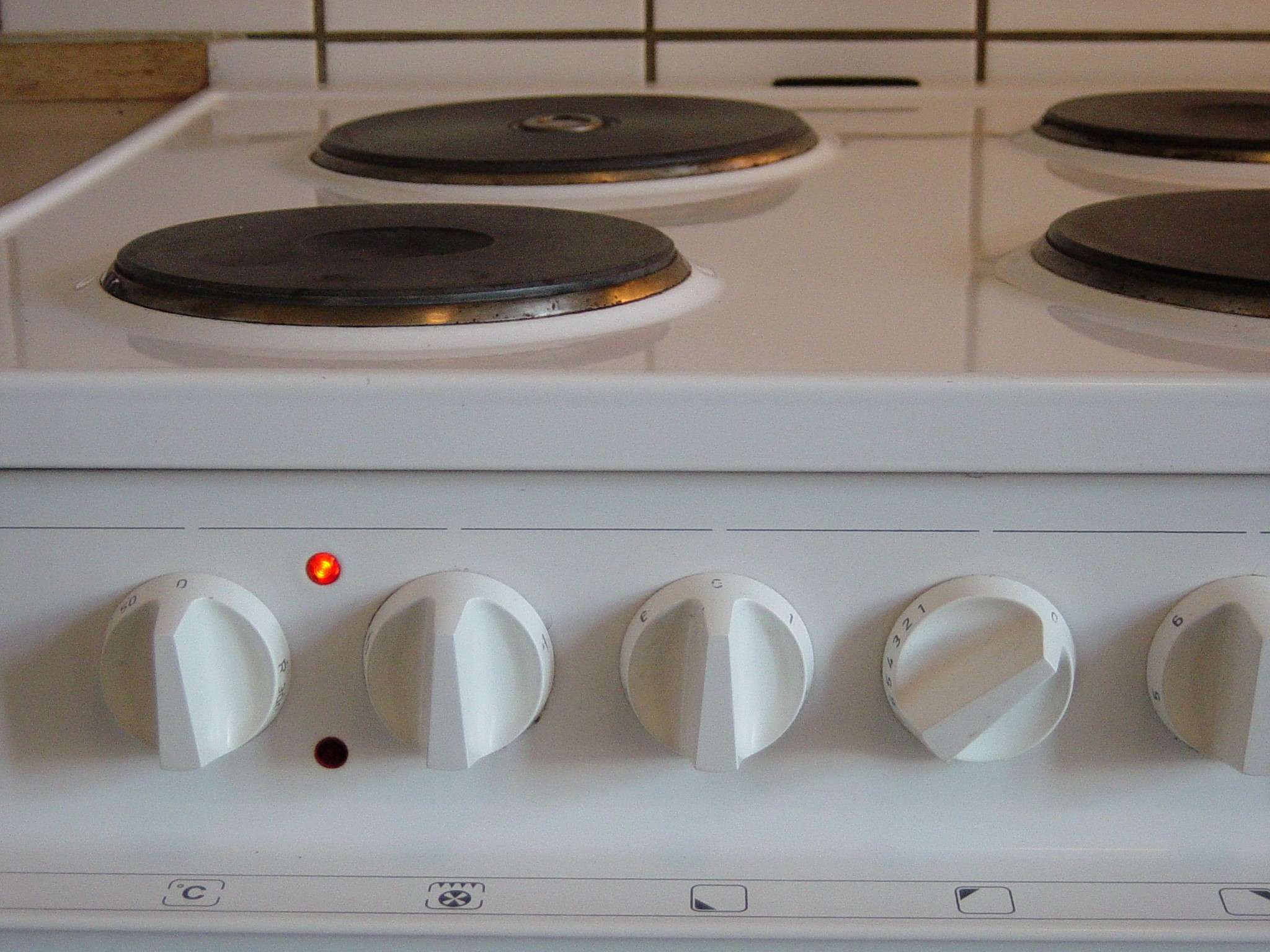
An electric stove, shown here from the European market, uses electricity to provide heat.

An electric stove, electric cooker or electric range is a stove with an integrated electrical heating device to cook and bake. Electric stoves became popular as replacements for solid-fuel (wood or coal) stoves that required more labor to operate and maintain. Some modern stoves come in a unit with built-in extractor hoods.

The stove's one or more "burners" (heating elements) may be controlled by a rotary switch with a finite number of positions; or may have an "infinite switch" called a simmerstat that allows constant variability between minimum and maximum heat settings. Some stove burners and controls incorporate thermostats.

== History ==
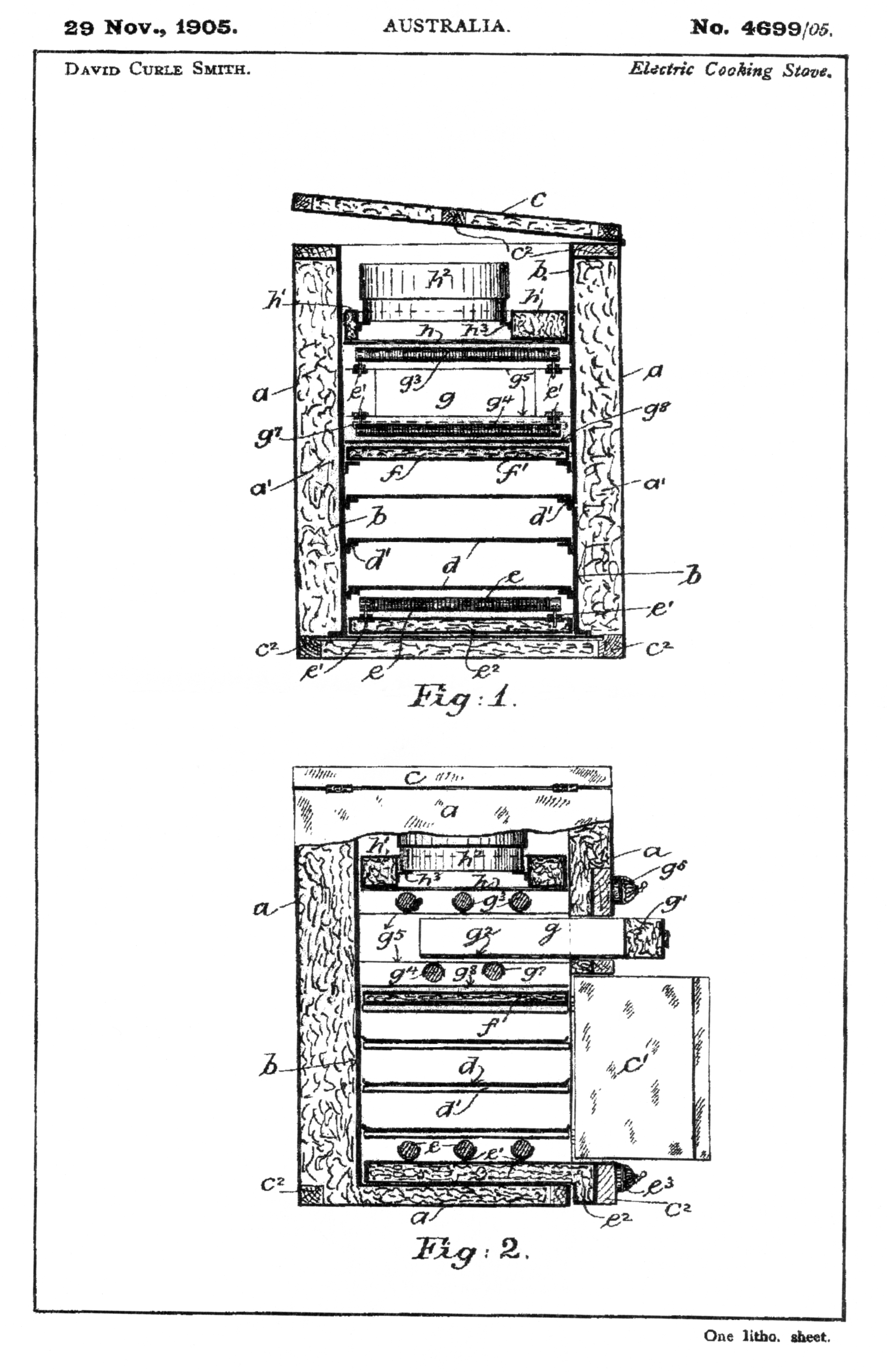
Drawings submitted on 29 November 1905 when David Curle Smith obtained an Australian patent (No. 4699/05) for his "electric cooking stove", also known as "The Kalgoorlie Stove".

=== Early patents ===
George B. Simpson was awarded U.S. patent 25,532 in 1859 for an 'electro-heater' surface heated by a platinum-wire coil powered by batteries. In his words, useful to "warm rooms, boil water, cook victuals...".

Canadian inventor Thomas Ahearn filed patent #39916 in 1892 for an "Electric Oven," a device he probably employed in preparing a meal for an Ottawa hotel that year. Ahearn and Warren Y. Soper were owners of Ottawa's Chaudiere Electric Light and Power Company. The electric stove was showcased at the Chicago World's Fair in 1893, where an electrified model kitchen was shown. Unlike the gas stove, the electrical stove was slow to catch on, partly due to the unfamiliar technology, and the need for cities and towns to be electrified.

William Hadaway was granted U.S. patent 574,537 in 1897 for an "Automatically Controlled Electric Oven".

=== Kalgoorlie Stove ===
In November 1905, David Curle Smith, the Municipal Electrical Engineer of Kalgoorlie, Western Australia, applied for a patent (Aust Patent No 4699/05) for a device that adopted (following the design of gas stoves) what later became the configuration for most electric stoves: an oven surmounted by a hotplate with a grill tray between them. Curle Smith's stove did not have a thermostat; heat was controlled by the number of the appliance's nine elements that were switched on.

After the patent was granted in 1906, manufacturing of Curle Smith's design commenced in October that year. The entire production run was acquired by the electricity supply department of Kalgoorlie Municipality, which hired out the stoves to residents. About 50 appliances were produced before cost overruns became a factor in Council politics and the project was suspended. This was the first time household electric stoves were produced with the express purpose of bringing "cooking by electricity ... within the reach of anyone". There are no extant examples of this stove, many of which were salvaged for their copper content during World War I.

To promote the stove, David Curle Smith's wife, H. Nora Curle Smith (née Helen Nora Murdoch, and a member of the Murdoch family prominent in Australian public life), wrote a cookbook containing operating instructions and 161 recipes. Thermo-Electrical Cooking Made Easy, published in March 1907, is therefore the world's first cookbook for electric stoves.

=== Coil ===
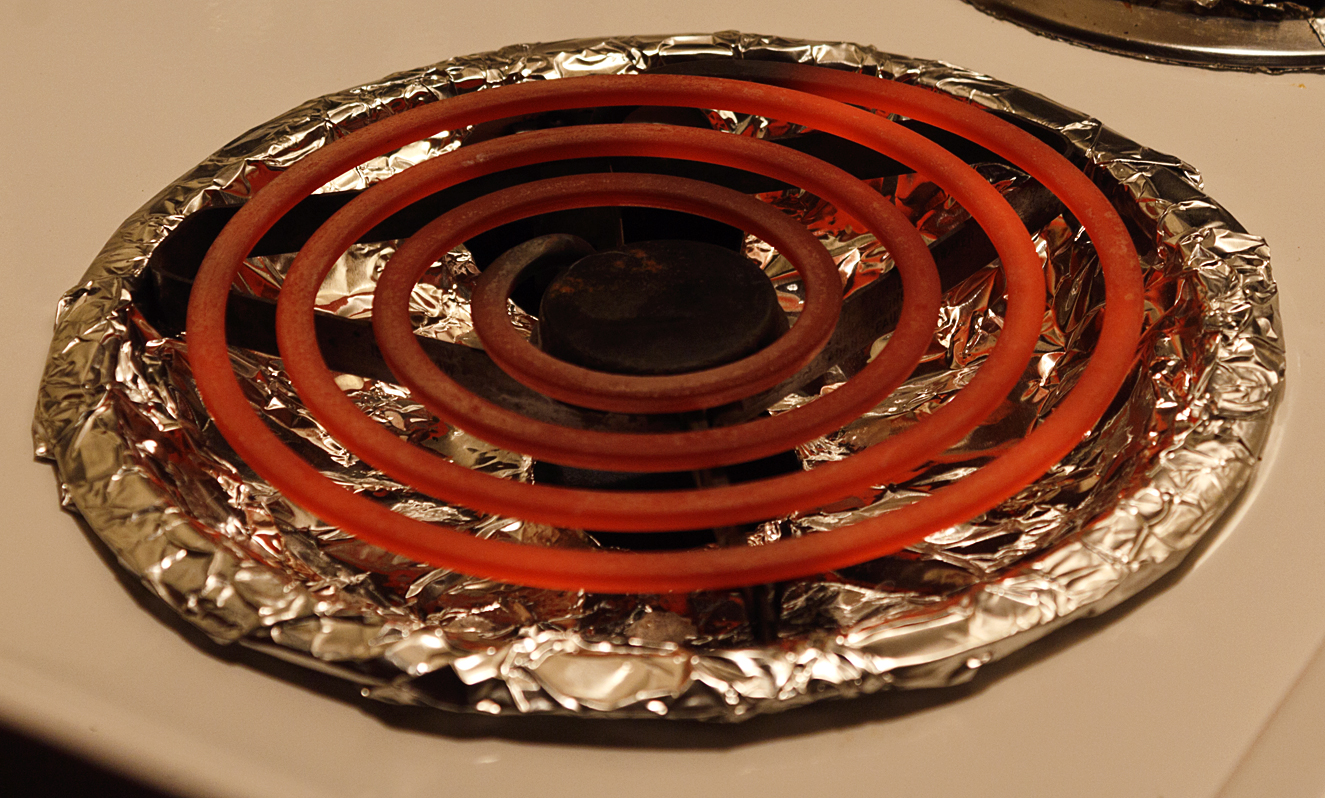
Typical electric stove element, designed in mid 20th century

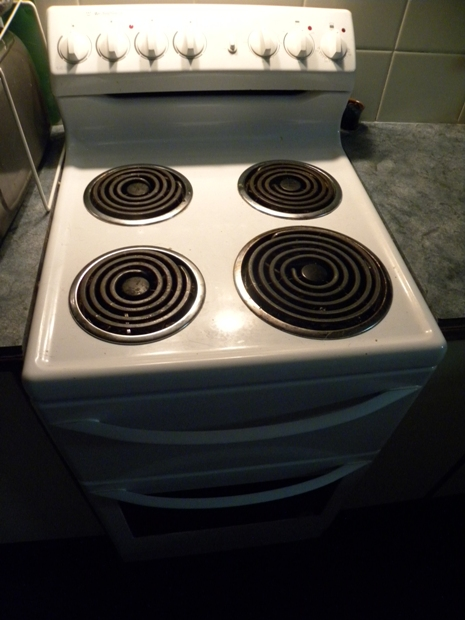
Typical 20th century electric stove from North America

Three companies, in the United States, began selling electric stoves in 1908. However, sales and public acceptance were slow to develop. Early electric stoves were unsatisfactory due to the cost of electricity (compared with wood, coal, or city gas), limited power available from the electrical supply company, poor temperature regulation, and short life of heating elements. The invention of nichrome alloy for resistance wires improved the cost and durability of heating elements. As late as the 1920s, an electric stove was still considered a novelty.

By the 1930s, the maturing of the technology, the decreased cost of electric power and modernized styling of electric stoves had greatly increased their acceptance. The electrical stove slowly began to replace the gas stove, especially in household kitchens.

Electric stoves and other household appliances were marketed by electrical utilities to build demand for electric power. During the expansion of rural electrification, demonstrations of cooking on an electric stove were popular.

Early electric stoves had resistive heating coils which heated iron hotplates, on top of which the pots were placed. Eventually, composite heating elements were introduced, with the resistive wires encased in hollow metal tubes packed with magnesite. These tubes, arranged in a spiral, support the cookware directly.

=== Glass-ceramic ===
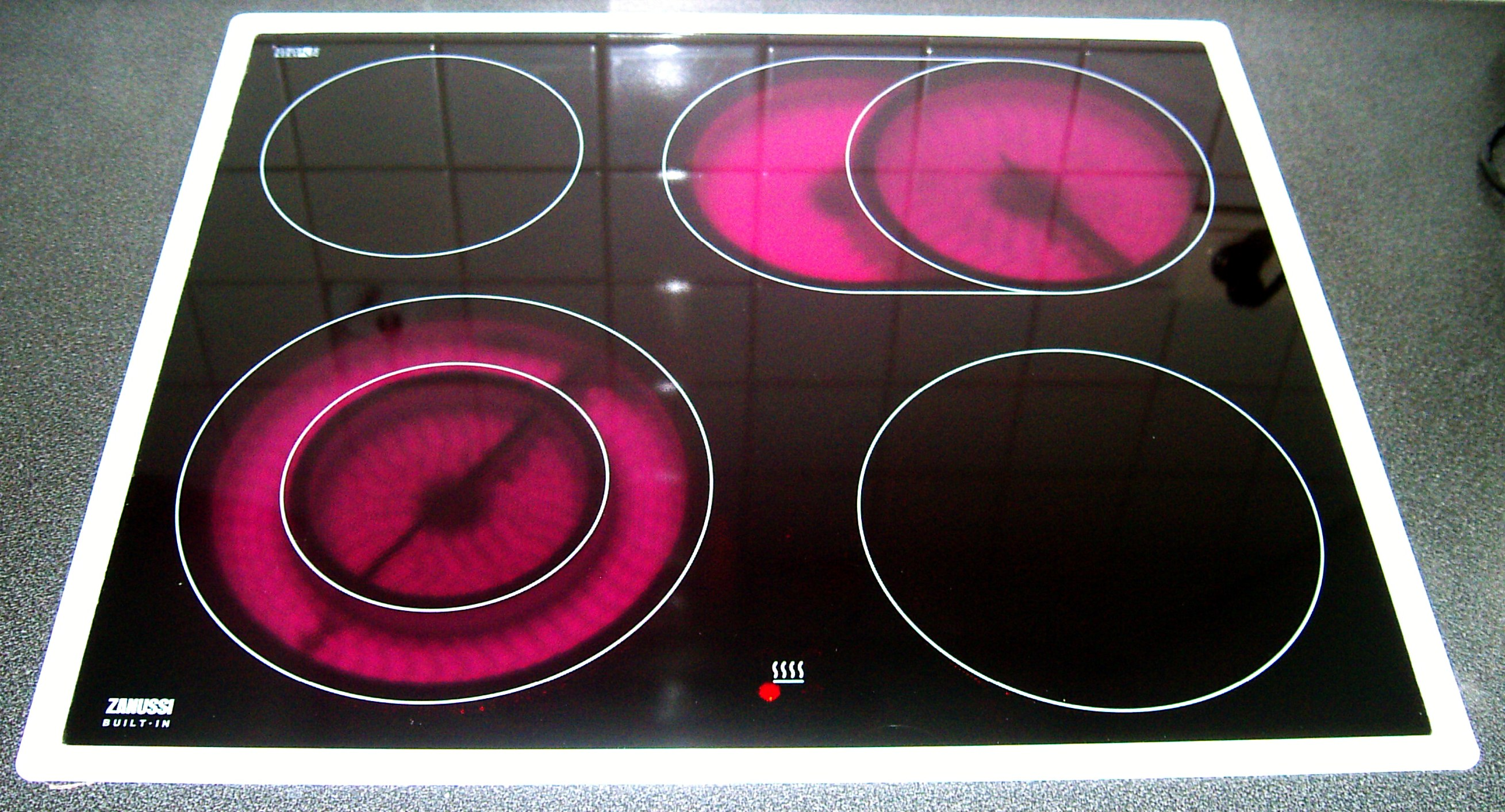
A glass-ceramic cooktop (2005)

In the 1970s, glass-ceramic cooktops started to appear. Glass-ceramic has very low thermal conductivity and a near-zero coefficient of thermal expansion, but lets infrared radiation pass very well. Electrical heating coils or halogen lamps are used as heating elements. Because of its physical characteristics, the cooktop heats more quickly, less afterheat remains, and only the plate heats up while the adjacent surface remains cool. These cooktops have a smooth surface and are thus easier to clean, but are markedly more expensive.

=== Induction ===
A third technology is the induction stove, which also has a smooth glass-ceramic surface. Only ferromagnetic cookware works with induction stoves, which heat by dint of electromagnetic induction.

== Electricity consumption ==
Typical electricity consumption of one heating element depending on size is 1–3 kW.

== See also ==
- Hot plate
- Gas stove
- List of stoves
