= Caesium titanate =

Names
- Other names Caesium titanium oxide

Identifiers
CAS Number	12158-57-5
3D model (JSmol)	Interactive image
ChemSpider	11215006
ECHA InfoCard	100.032.063
EC Number	235-283-1
PubChem CID	44720987
CompTox Dashboard (EPA)	DTXSID10923872
- InChI: InChI=1S/2Cs.3O.Ti/q2*+1;;2*-1; Key: GQIPNNKRGFPONZ-UHFFFAOYSA-N
- SMILES: O=[Ti](O[Cs])O[Cs]

Properties
Chemical formula	Cs_{2}TiO_{3}
Molar mass	361.71 g/mol
Appearance	White powder
Solubility in water	Insoluble

Hazards
- GHS labelling
Pictograms	(GHS07: Exclamation mark)
Signal word	Warning
NFPA 704 (fire diamond)	1 0 0

Related compounds
Other anions	Caesium oxide
Other cations	Iron(II) titanate Barium titanate
- Except where otherwise noted, data are given for materials in their standard state (at 25 °C [77 °F], 100 kPa). verify (what is ?) Infobox references

Caesium titanate or cesium titanate is an inorganic compound with the formula Cs_{2}TiO_{3}. Like most other inorganic titanates, it adopts a polymeric structure with Cs-O and Ti-O bonds.

Other caesium titanates include Cs_{2}Ti_{5}O_{11} and Cs_{2}Ti_{6}O_{13} and the hydrate Cs_{2}Ti_{5}O_{11}•1.5H_{2}O.
