= Lead titanate =

Names
- Other names Lead(II) titanate Lead titanium oxide Lead(II) titanium oxide

Identifiers
| CAS Number | 12060-00-3 |
| 3D model (JSmol) | Interactive image |
| ChemSpider | 17339539 |
| ECHA InfoCard | 100.031.841 |
| EC Number | 235-038-9 |
| PubChem CID | 16211560 |
| CompTox Dashboard (EPA) | DTXSID1093963 |
- InChI: InChI=1S/3O.Pb.Ti/q;2*-1;+2; Key: NKZSPGSOXYXWQA-UHFFFAOYSA-N
- SMILES: [O-][Ti](=O)[O-].[Pb+2]

Properties
| Chemical formula | PbTiO_{3} |
| Molar mass | 303.09 g/mol |
| Appearance | Yellow powder |
| Density | 7.52 g/cm^{3} |
| Solubility in water | Insoluble |

Hazards
- GHS labelling
| Pictograms | (GHS07: Exclamation mark) (GHS08: Health hazard) (GHS09: Environmental hazard) |
| Signal word | Danger |
| Hazard statements | H302, H332, H360, H373, H410 |
| Precautionary statements | P201, P261, P273, P304+P340, P308+P313, P312, P391 |
| NFPA 704 (fire diamond) | 2 0 0 |
- Lethal dose or concentration (LD, LC)
| LD_{50} (median dose) | 12000 mg/kg (rat) |
| Safety data sheet (SDS) | MSDS |

Related compounds
| Other anions | Lead dioxide Lead acetate |
| Other cations | Caesium titanate Iron(II) titanate |
- Except where otherwise noted, data are given for materials in their standard state (at 25 °C [77 °F], 100 kPa). verify (what is ?) Infobox references

Lead(II) titanate is an inorganic compound with the chemical formula PbTiO_{3}. It is the lead salt of titanic acid. Lead(II) titanate is a yellow powder that is insoluble in water.

At high temperatures, lead titanate adopts a cubic perovskite structure. At 760 K, the material undergoes a second order phase transition to a tetragonal perovskite structure which exhibits ferroelectricity. Lead titanate is one of the end members of the lead zirconate titanate (Pb[Zr_{x}T_{1−x}]O_{3}, 0 ≤ x ≤ 1, PZT) system, which is technologically one of the most important ferroelectric and piezoelectric ceramics; PbTiO_{3} has a high ratio of k33 to kp with a high kt.

Lead titanate occurs in nature as mineral macedonite.

== Toxicity ==
Lead titanate is toxic, like other lead compounds. It irritates skin, mucous membranes and eyes. It may also cause harm to unborn babies and might have effects on fertility.

== Solubility in water ==
The solubility of hydrothermally-synthesized perovskite-phase PbTiO_{3} in water was experimentally determined at 25 and 80 °C to depend on pH and vary from 4.9 × 10^{−4} mol/kg at pH≈3, to 1.9 × 10^{−4} mol/kg at pH≈7.7, to "undetectable" (<3.2 × 10^{−7} mol/kg) in the range 10<pH<11. At still higher pH values, the solubility increased again. The solubility was apparently incongruent and was quantified as the analytical concentration of Pb.
