= Pilot Training College =

Flight training organization

The Pilot Training College of Ireland Ltd was a flight training organization that was fully approved to provide commercial pilot training to trainees.

In July 2012, RTÉ reported that Irish students who had paid up to €80,000 in fees to train in Florida had been stranded because the Florida Institute of Technology had terminated its agreement with PTC over alleged non-payment. That same month the IAA withdrew PTC's license. As a result, PTC ceased all training, and their website was taken offline with no official explanation or apology. In 2012, a trainee pilot named Conor J. Deeny assumed the position of spokesman and coordinator for the students who flew from Ireland to train in Florida.

Since this incident, he and all other trainee pilots have left America and returned home.

== Training and facilities ==
PTC had training facilities in Waterford Airport, Ireland, and multiple locations in Florida, United States. The training provided was in accordance with the European Joint Aviation Authorities (JAA) requirements for commercial pilots.

The school offered a range of courses, including:

- BSc (Hons) in Airline Transport Operations (3 years full-time and 2 years part-time)
- Integrated Airline Training Program
- Airline Pilot Training Program
- Pilot license and rating conversions
- Individual modular courses (ATPL, commercial pilot license (CPL), MEP, MEIR)
