= PTC rubber =

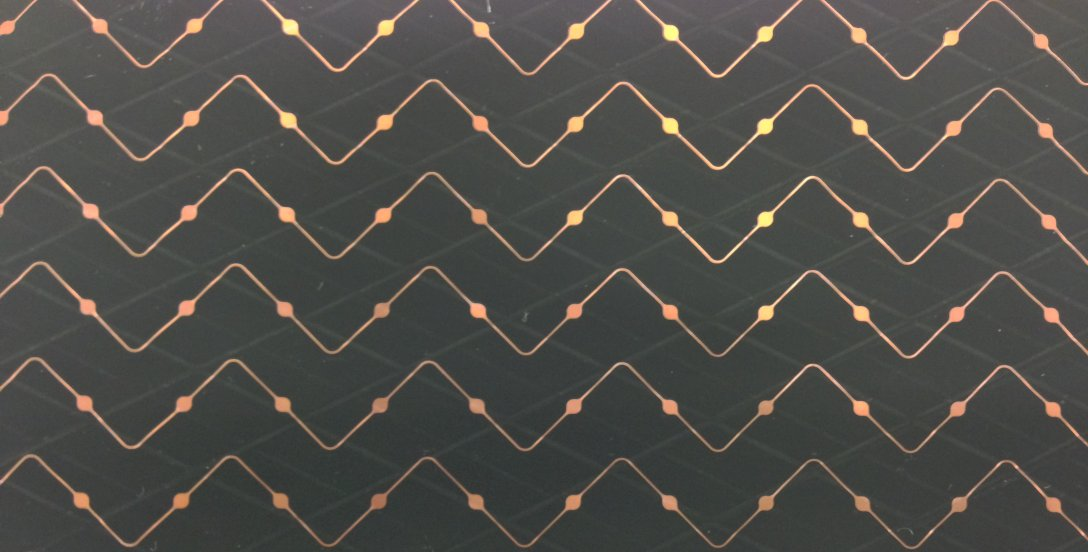
PTC rubber, a material for which the resistivity grows exponentially with increasing temperature up to a temperature where it ceases to conduct electricity. Above this temperature the material is an electrical insulator.

PTC rubber is a silicone rubber which conducts electricity with a resistivity that increases exponentially with increasing temperature for all temperatures up to a temperature where the resistivity grows to infinity. Above this temperature the PTC rubber is an electrical insulator. PTC rubber is made from polydimethylsiloxane (PDMS) loaded with carbon nanoparticles. PTC stands for Positive temperature coefficient.

== Properties ==
If the electric field strength inside the material is large enough (typically larger than 30 V/mm), the carbon nanoparticles trigger a quantum mechanical tunneling effect current to flow through the material. The contribution from a large number of small tunneling effect currents can add up to macroscopic currents in the range of amperes. The quantum mechanical tunneling effect inside the material is highly temperature dependent. The current decreases exponentially with increasing temperature. This means that the resistivity of the material grows exponentially with increasing temperature. At a specific temperature the quantum mechanical tunneling effect current ceases. At temperatures higher than this the PTC rubber is an electrical insulator and no electrical current can flow through it. This temperature can be adjusted between 0 and +80 °C during the production of the PTC rubber. Hence, PTC rubber is a PTC material with very strong PTC characteristics. In fact, PTC rubber has the strongest PTC effect of all known materials, and over a wide temperature range. It has PTC properties for all temperatures.

== Applications ==
The PTC rubber can be rolled into thin sheets and laminated with copper. The copper is in turn connected to a voltage to provide the electrical field inside the material necessary to trigger the tunneling effect. The sheets can be formed into any shape and size.

PTC rubber sheets can be used as thin flexible PTC heaters. These heaters will provide high power when they are cold and rapidly heat up themselves to a constant temperature and remain there virtually unaffected by changes in the ambient conditions. They can be powered with any voltage between 5 and 230 V, AC or DC.

The PTC rubber material is a self-regulating heater. It produces the same amount of heat in each point of the heater as is conducted and radiated away from the heater to the object it is attached to, and its surroundings. It is in constant thermal equilibrium with the environment, point by point. A measure of the power produced by the heater is actually a measurement of the heat transfer between the heater and the object. Hence, it can be used as a heat transfer sensor.
