= Temperature coefficient =

Differential equation parameter in thermal physics

A temperature coefficient describes the relative change of a physical property that is associated with a given change in temperature. For a property R that changes when the temperature changes by dT, the temperature coefficient α is defined by the equation below:

$$\frac{dR}{R} = \alpha\,dT$$

Here α has the dimension of an inverse temperature and can be expressed e.g. in 1/K or K^{−1}.

If the temperature coefficient itself does not vary too much with temperature and $\alpha\Delta T \ll 1$, a linear approximation will be useful in estimating the value R of a property at a temperature T, given its value R_{0} at a reference temperature T_{0}:

$$R(T) = R(T_0)(1 + \alpha\Delta T),$$

where ΔT is the difference between T and T_{0}.

For strongly temperature-dependent α, this approximation is only useful for small temperature differences ΔT.

Temperature coefficients are specified for various applications, including electric and magnetic properties of materials as well as reactivity. The temperature coefficient of most of the reactions lies between 2 and 3.

== Negative temperature coefficient ==
Most ceramics exhibit negative temperature dependence of resistance behaviour. This effect is governed by an Arrhenius equation over a wide range of temperatures:

$$R = Ae^{\frac{B}{T}}$$

where R is resistance, A and B are constants, and T is absolute temperature (K).

The constant B is related to the energies required to form and move the charge carriers responsible for electrical conduction – hence, as the value of B increases, the material becomes insulating. Practical and commercial NTC resistors aim to combine modest resistance with a value of B that provides good sensitivity to temperature. Such is the importance of the B constant value, that it is possible to characterize NTC thermistors using the B parameter equation:

$$R = r^{\infty}e^{\frac{B}{T}} = R_{0}e^{-\frac{B}{T_{0}}}e^{\frac{B}{T}}$$

where $R_{0}$ is resistance at temperature $T_{0}$.

Therefore, many materials that produce acceptable values of $R_{0}$ include materials that have been alloyed or possess variable negative temperature coefficient (NTC), which occurs when a physical property (such as thermal conductivity or electrical resistivity) of a material lowers with increasing temperature, typically in a defined temperature range. For most materials, electrical resistivity will decrease with increasing temperature.

Materials with a negative temperature coefficient have been used in floor heating since 1971. The negative temperature coefficient avoids excessive local heating beneath carpets, bean bag chairs, mattresses, etc., which can damage wooden floors, and may infrequently cause fires.

== Reversible temperature coefficient ==
Residual magnetic flux density or B_{r} changes with temperature and it is one of the important characteristics of magnet performance. Some applications, such as inertial gyroscopes and traveling-wave tubes (TWTs), need to have constant field over a wide temperature range. The reversible temperature coefficient (RTC) of B_{r} is defined as:

$$\text{RTC} = \frac{|\Delta\mathbf{B}_r|}{|\mathbf{B}_r|\Delta T} \times 100\%$$

To address these requirements, temperature compensated magnets were developed in the late 1970s. For conventional SmCo magnets, B_{r} decreases as temperature increases. Conversely, for GdCo magnets, B_{r} increases as temperature increases within certain temperature ranges. By combining samarium and gadolinium in the alloy, the temperature coefficient can be reduced to nearly zero.

== Electrical resistance ==
The temperature dependence of electrical resistance and thus of electronic devices (wires, resistors) has to be taken into account when constructing devices and circuits. The temperature dependence of conductors is to a great degree linear and can be described by the approximation below.

$$\operatorname{\rho}(T) = \rho_{0}\left[1 + \alpha_{0}\left(T - T_{0}\right)\right]$$

where

$$\alpha_{0} = \frac{1}{\rho_{0}}\left[ \frac{\delta \rho}{\delta T} \right]_{T=T_{0}}$$

$\rho_{0}$ just corresponds to the specific resistance temperature coefficient at a specified reference value (normally T = 0 °C)

That of a semiconductor is however exponential:

$$\operatorname{\rho}(T) = S \alpha^{\frac{B}{T}}$$

where $S$ is defined as the cross sectional area and $\alpha$ and $B$ are coefficients determining the shape of the function and the value of resistivity at a given temperature.

For both, $\alpha$ is referred to as the temperature coefficient of resistance (TCR).

This property is used in devices such as thermistors.

=== Positive temperature coefficient of resistance ===
A positive temperature coefficient (PTC) refers to materials that experience an increase in electrical resistance when their temperature is raised. Materials which have useful engineering applications usually show a relatively rapid increase with temperature, i.e. a higher coefficient. The higher the coefficient, the greater an increase in electrical resistance for a given temperature increase. A PTC material can be designed to reach a maximum temperature for a given input voltage, since at some point any further increase in temperature would be met with greater electrical resistance. Unlike linear resistance heating or NTC materials, PTC materials are inherently self-limiting. On the other hand, NTC material may also be inherently self-limiting if constant current power source is used.

Some materials even have exponentially increasing temperature coefficient. Example of such a material is PTC rubber.

=== Negative temperature coefficient of resistance ===
A negative temperature coefficient (NTC) refers to materials that experience a decrease in electrical resistance when their temperature is raised. Materials which have useful engineering applications usually show a relatively rapid decrease with temperature, i.e. a lower coefficient. The lower the coefficient, the greater a decrease in electrical resistance for a given temperature increase. NTC materials are used to create inrush current limiters (because they present higher initial resistance until the current limiter reaches quiescent temperature), temperature sensors and thermistors.

=== Negative temperature coefficient of resistance of a semiconductor ===
An increase in the temperature of a semiconducting material results in an increase in charge-carrier concentration. This results in a higher number of charge carriers available for recombination, increasing the conductivity of the semiconductor. The increasing conductivity causes the resistivity of the semiconductor material to decrease with the rise in temperature, resulting in a negative temperature coefficient of resistance.

== Temperature coefficient of elasticity ==
The elastic modulus of elastic materials varies with temperature, typically decreasing with higher temperature.

== Temperature coefficient of reactivity ==
In nuclear engineering, the temperature coefficient of reactivity is a measure of the change in reactivity (resulting in a change in power), brought about by a change in temperature of the reactor components or the reactor coolant. This may be defined as

$$\alpha_{T} = \frac{\partial \rho}{\partial T}$$

Where $\rho$ is reactivity and T is temperature. The relationship shows that $\alpha_{T}$ is the value of the partial differential of reactivity with respect to temperature and is referred to as the "temperature coefficient of reactivity". As a result, the temperature feedback provided by $\alpha_{T}$ has an intuitive application to passive nuclear safety. A negative $\alpha_{T}$ is broadly cited as important for reactor safety, but wide temperature variations across real reactors (as opposed to a theoretical homogeneous reactor) limit the usability of a single metric as a marker of reactor safety.

In water moderated nuclear reactors, the bulk of reactivity changes with respect to temperature are brought about by changes in the temperature of the water. However each element of the core has a specific temperature coefficient of reactivity (e.g. the fuel or cladding). The mechanisms which drive fuel temperature coefficients of reactivity are different from water temperature coefficients. While water expands as temperature increases, causing longer neutron travel times during moderation, fuel material will not expand appreciably. Changes in reactivity in fuel due to temperature stem from a phenomenon known as doppler broadening, where resonance absorption of fast neutrons in fuel filler material prevents those neutrons from thermalizing (slowing down).

== Mathematical derivation of temperature coefficient approximation ==
In its more general form, the temperature coefficient differential law is:

$$\frac{dR}{dT} = \alpha\,R$$

Where is defined:

$$R_0 = R(T_0)$$

And $\alpha$ is independent of $T$.

Integrating the temperature coefficient differential law:

$$\int_{R_0}^{R(T)}\frac{dR}{R} = \int_{T_0}^{T} \alpha\,dT ~\Rightarrow~
\ln(R)\Bigg\vert_{R_0}^{R(T)} = \alpha(T - T_0) ~\Rightarrow~
\ln\left( \frac{R(T)}{R_0} \right) = \alpha(T - T_0) ~\Rightarrow~
R(T) = R_0 e^{\alpha(T-T_0)}$$

Applying the Taylor series approximation at the first order, in the proximity of $T_0$, leads to:

$$R(T) = R_0(1 + \alpha(T - T_0))$$

== Units ==
The thermal coefficient of electrical circuit parts is sometimes specified as ppm/°C, or ppm/K. This specifies the fraction (expressed in parts per million) that its electrical characteristics will deviate when taken to a temperature above or below the operating temperature.

== See also ==
- Microbolometer (used to measure TCRs)

== Bibliography ==
- Duderstadt, Jame J.; Hamilton, Louis J. (1976). Nuclear Reactor Analysis. Wiley. ISBN 0-471-22363-8.
