= Kirazuri =

Ukiyoe printing technique also applied to paper decoration

Kirazuri (雲母摺り) is a method used in Japanese woodblock printmaking using mica powder, or 雲母 (kira) to add sparkle.

When used for the background in portraits, depending on the base color, it is called Shiro-kirazuri (white), Kuro-kirazuri (literally black, but dark gray practically), and Beni-kirazuri (red).

== Types ==
There are several different types of kirazuri:

- Surikira (摺り雲母) which is a printing method where mica is mixed into the printing ink. Mineral paints are diluted with water and gelatin as binding, and put on the printing woodblock for background coloring.
- Makikira (撒き雲母) where very fine mica peppers are applied on paper using a sprinkling tool. While adhesive brushed onto paper surface is still wet, mica is shaken over it and attaches to it. Unfixed mica is removed with brush strokes after the paper dries.
- Okikira (置き雲母) the design is painted with a mixture of mica and glue on brush, and the glue functions as a thickening agent to give texture to brush strokes.

== Gallery ==
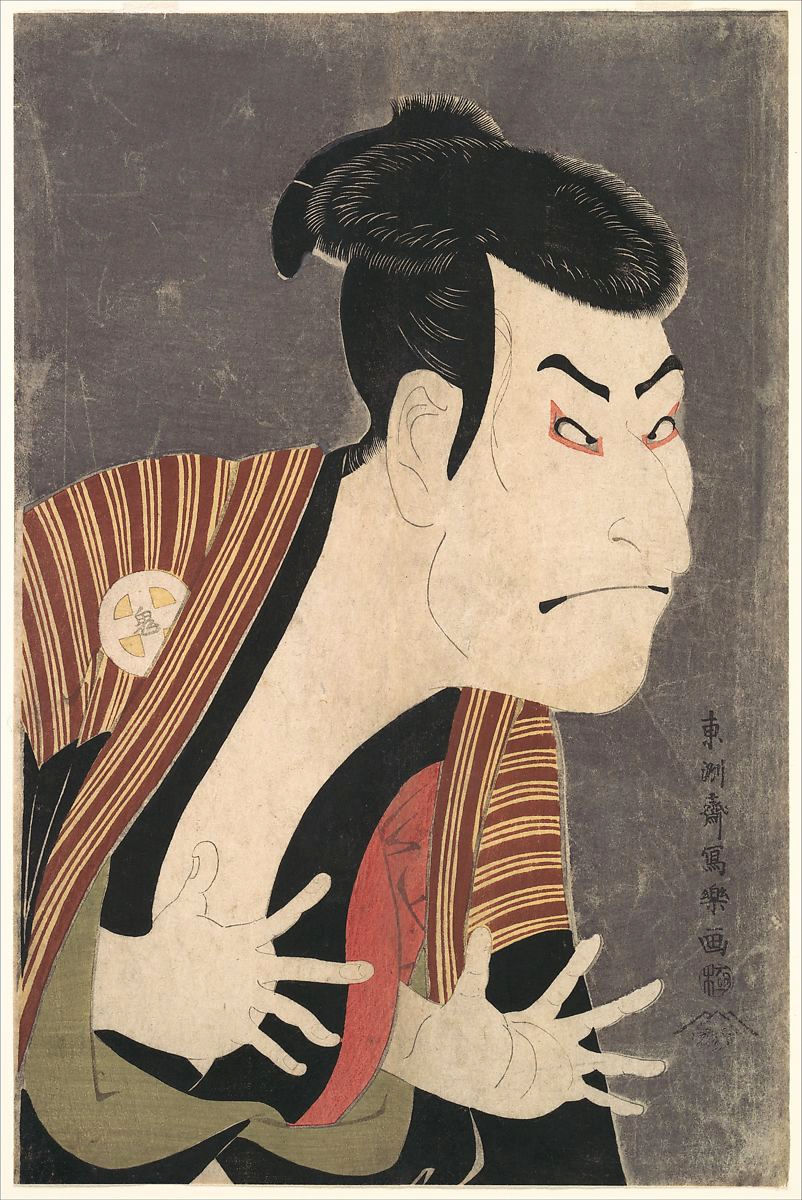
Kuro-kirazuri in a print by Sharaku, 1794

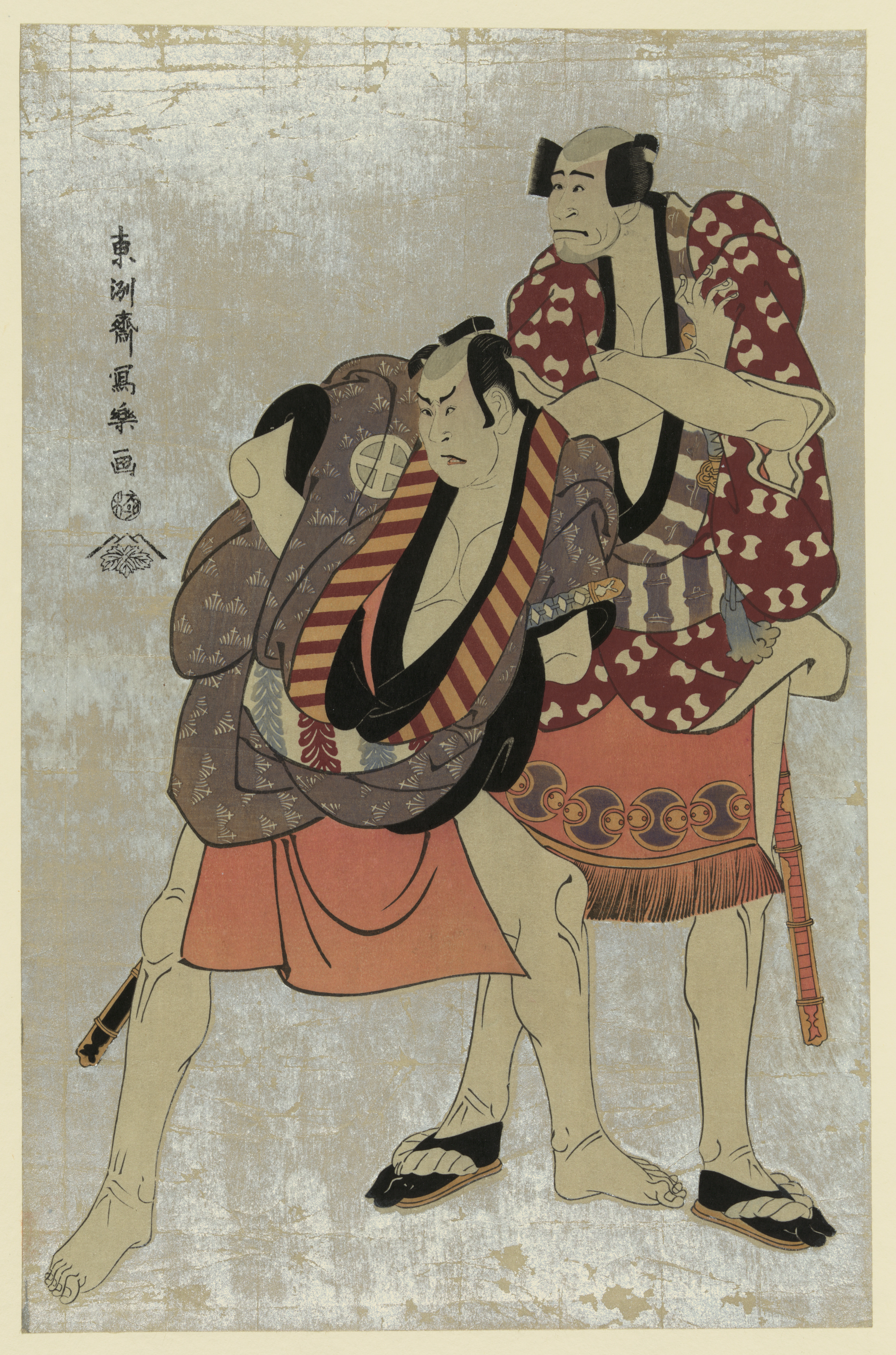
Shiro-kirazuri, or mica ink printed on white background. A scene from a kabuki play

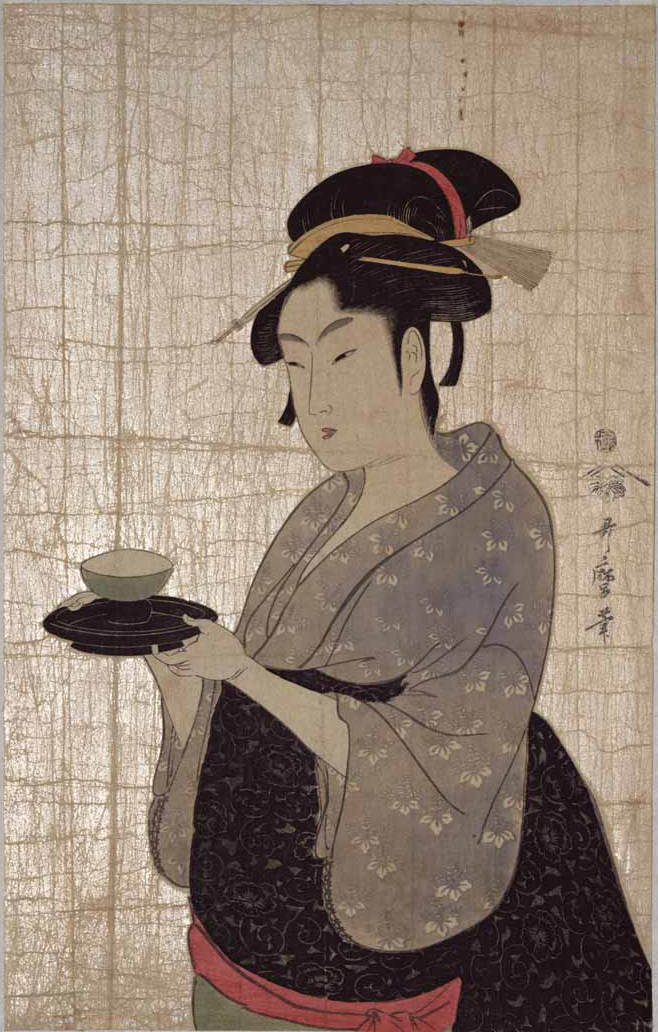
Utamaro applied kirazuri on the background of this picture of a tea house waitress

== See also ==
- Sharaku
- Utamaro
