= Mica =

Group of phyllosilicate minerals

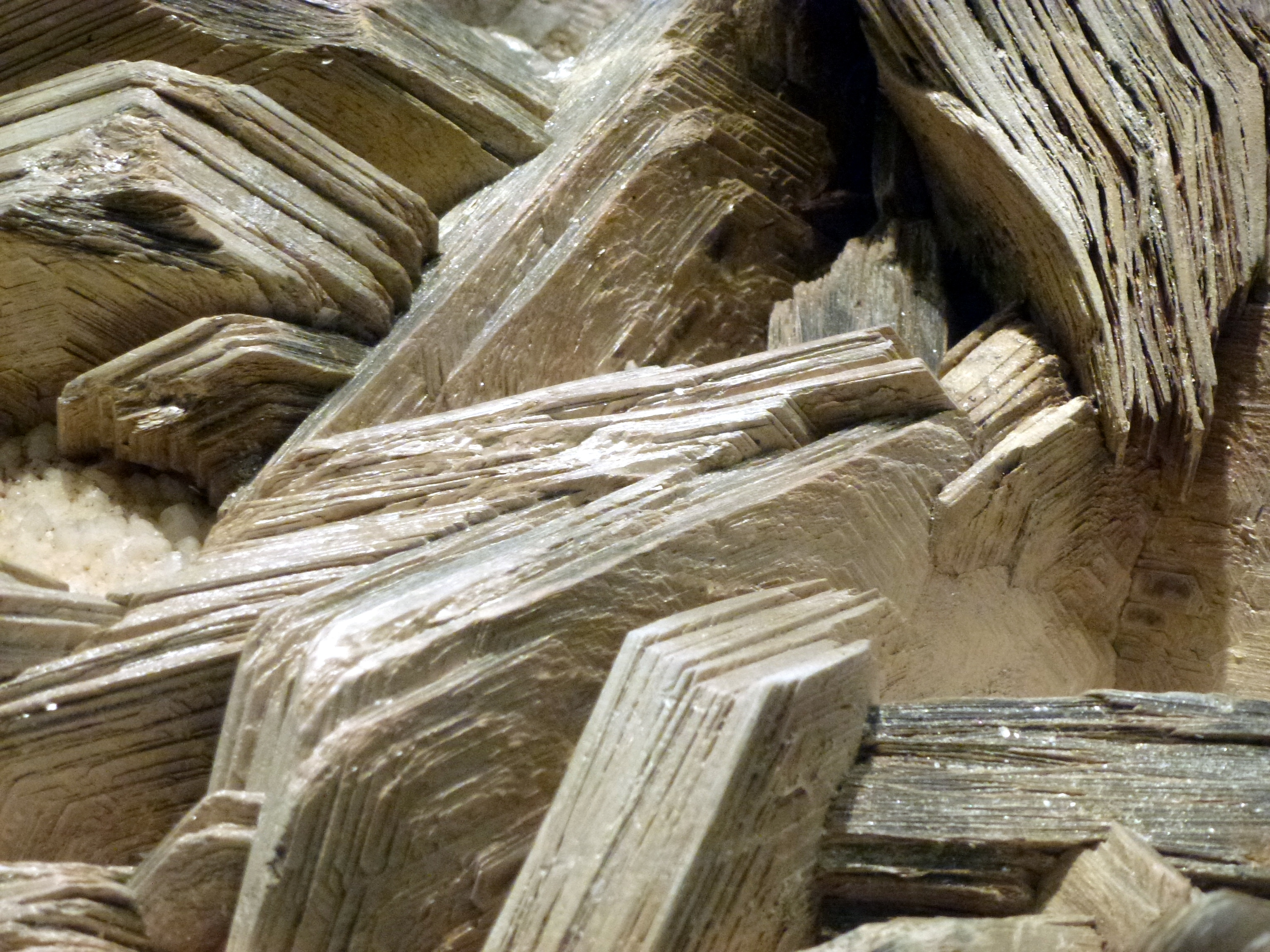

General
- Category: Phyllosilicate minerals
- Formula: AB_{2–3}(X, Si)_{4}O_{10}(O, F, OH)_{2}
- IMA symbol: Mca

Identification
- Color: purple, rosy, silver, gray (lepidolite); dark green, brown, black (biotite); yellowish-brown, green-white (phlogopite); colorless, transparent (muscovite)
- Cleavage: Nearly perfect
- Fracture: flaky
- Mohs scale hardness: 2.5–4 (lepidolite); 2.5–3 (biotite); 2.5–3 (phlogopite); 2–2.5 (muscovite)
- Luster: pearly, vitreous
- Streak: White, colorless
- Specific gravity: 2.8–3.0
- Diagnostic features: cleavage

Micas (/ˈmaɪkəz/) are a group of silicate minerals whose outstanding physical characteristic is that individual mica crystals can easily be split into fragile elastic plates. This characteristic is described as perfect basal cleavage. Mica is common in igneous and metamorphic rock and is occasionally found as small flakes in sedimentary rock. It is particularly prominent in many granites, pegmatites, and schists, and "books" (large individual crystals) of mica several feet across have been found in some pegmatites.

Micas are used in products such as drywalls, paints, and fillers, especially in parts for automobiles, roofing, and in electronics. The mineral is used in cosmetics and food to add "shimmer" or "frost".

== Properties and structure ==
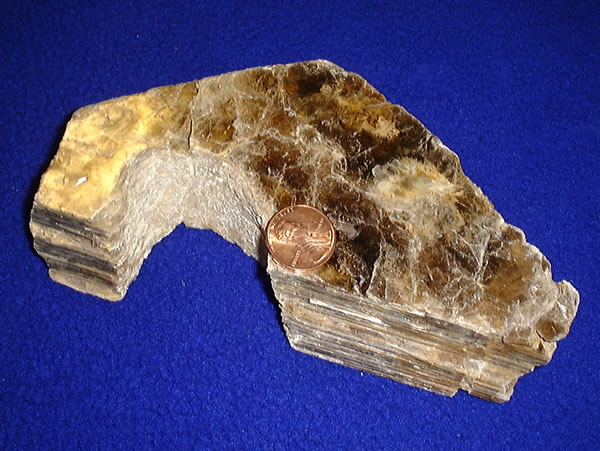
Sheets of mica

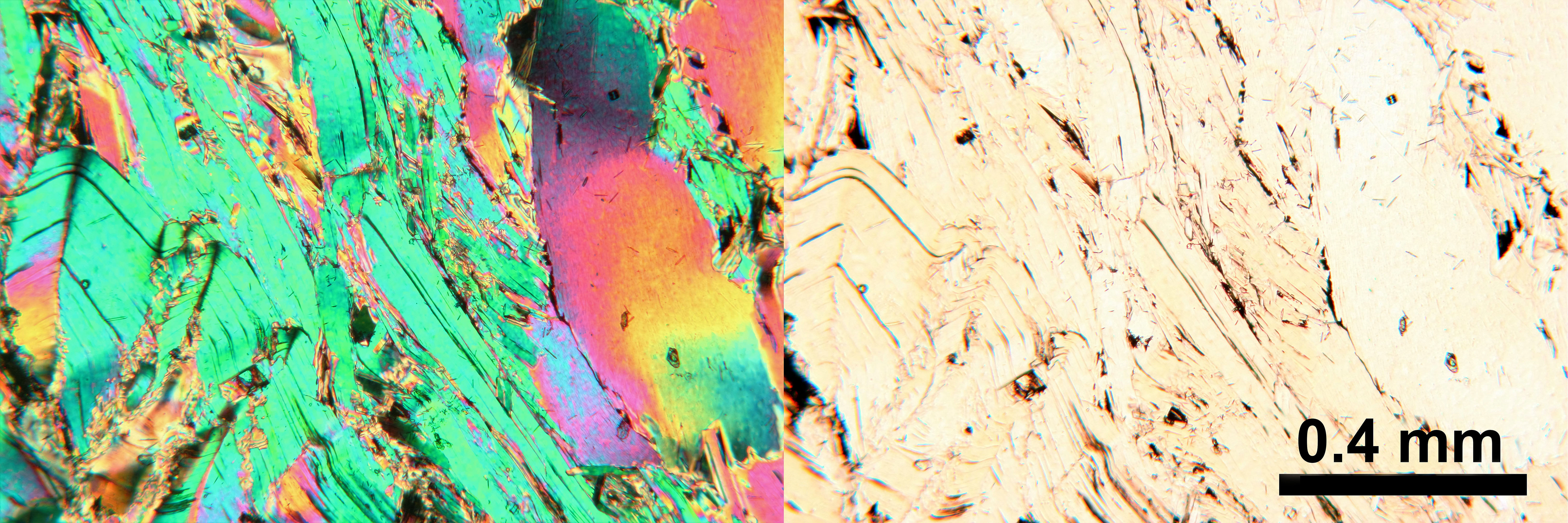
Photomicrographs of a thin section containing phlogopite. In cross-polarized light on the left, plane-polarized light on the right.

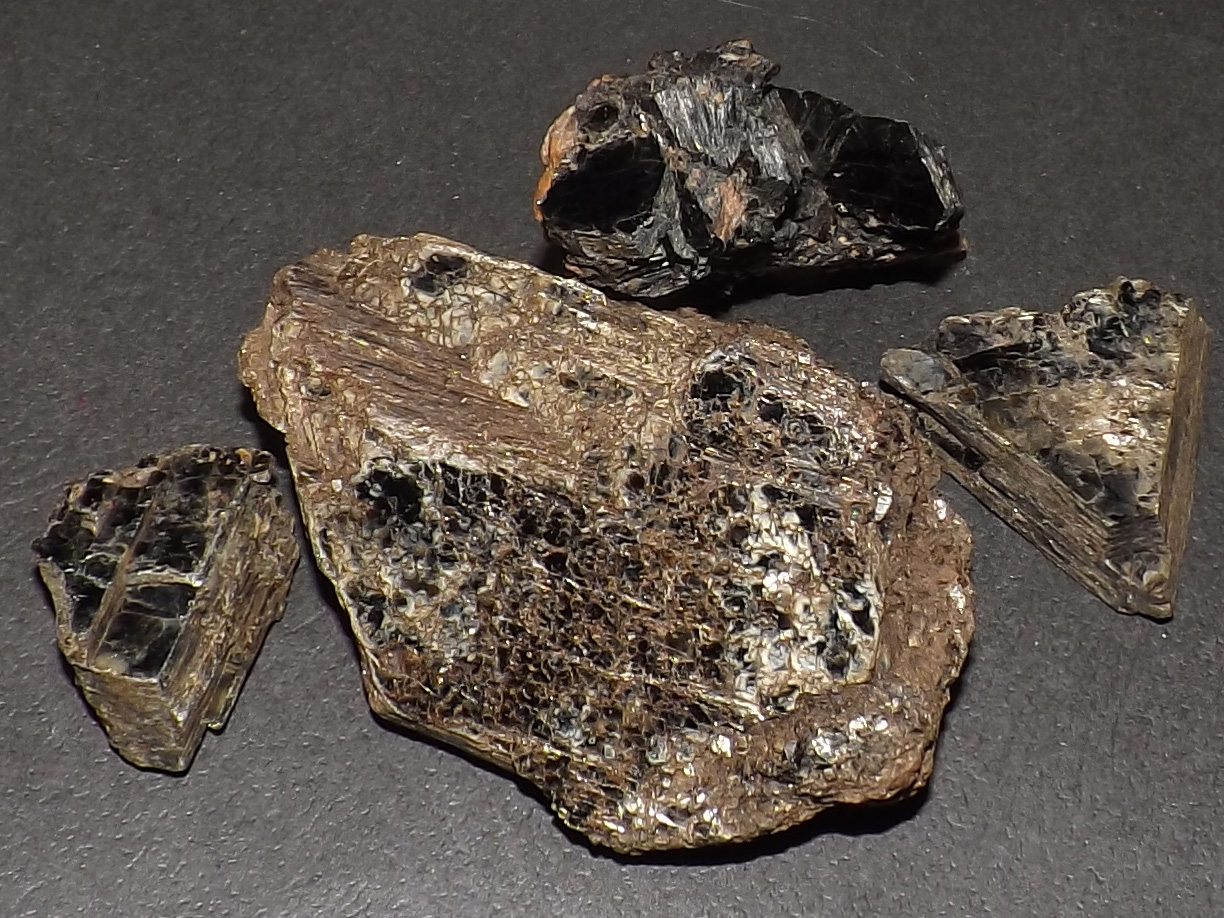
Dark mica from eastern Ontario

The mica group comprises 37 phyllosilicate minerals. All crystallize in the monoclinic system, with a tendency towards pseudohexagonal crystals, and are similar in structure but vary in chemical composition. Micas are translucent to opaque with a distinct vitreous or pearly luster, and different mica minerals display colors ranging from white to green or red to black. Deposits of mica tend to have a flaky or platy appearance.

The crystal structure of mica is described as TOT-c, meaning that it is composed of parallel TOT layers weakly bonded to each other by cations (c). The TOT layers in turn consist of two tetrahedral sheets (T) strongly bonded to the two faces of a single octahedral sheet (O). The relatively weak ionic bonding between TOT layers gives mica its perfect basal cleavage.

The tetrahedral sheets consist of silica tetrahedra, each silicon ion surrounded by four oxygen ions. In most micas, one in four silicon ions is replaced by an aluminium ion, while aluminium ions replace half the silicon ions in brittle micas. The tetrahedra share three of their four oxygen ions with neighbouring tetrahedra to produce a hexagonal sheet. The remaining oxygen ion (the apical oxygen ion) is available to bond with the octahedral sheet.

The octahedral sheet can be dioctahedral or trioctahedral. A trioctahedral sheet has the structure of a sheet of the mineral brucite, with magnesium or ferrous iron being the most common cation. A dioctahedral sheet has the structure and (typically) the composition of a gibbsite sheet, with aluminium being the cation. Apical oxygens take the place of some of the hydroxyl ions that would be present in a brucite or gibbsite sheet, bonding the tetrahedral sheets tightly to the octahedral sheet.

Tetrahedral sheets have a strong negative charge since their bulk composition is AlSi_{3}O^{5−}_{10}. The octahedral sheet has a positive charge, since its bulk composition is Al(OH)^{2+} (for a dioctahedral sheet with the apical sites vacant) or M_{3}(OH)^{4+}_{2} (for a trioctahedral site with the apical sites vacant; M represents a divalent ion such as ferrous iron or magnesium) The combined TOT layer has a residual negative charge, since its bulk composition is Al_{2}(AlSi_{3}O_{10})(OH)^{−}_{2} or M_{3}(AlSi_{3}O_{10})(OH)^{−}_{2}. The remaining negative charge of the TOT layer is neutralized by the interlayer cations (typically sodium, potassium, or calcium ions).

Because the hexagons in the T and O sheets are slightly different in size, the sheets are slightly distorted when they bond into a TOT layer. This breaks the hexagonal symmetry and reduces it to monoclinic symmetry. However, the original hexahedral symmetry is discernible in the pseudohexagonal character of mica crystals. The short-range order of K^{+} ions on cleaved muscovite mica has been resolved.

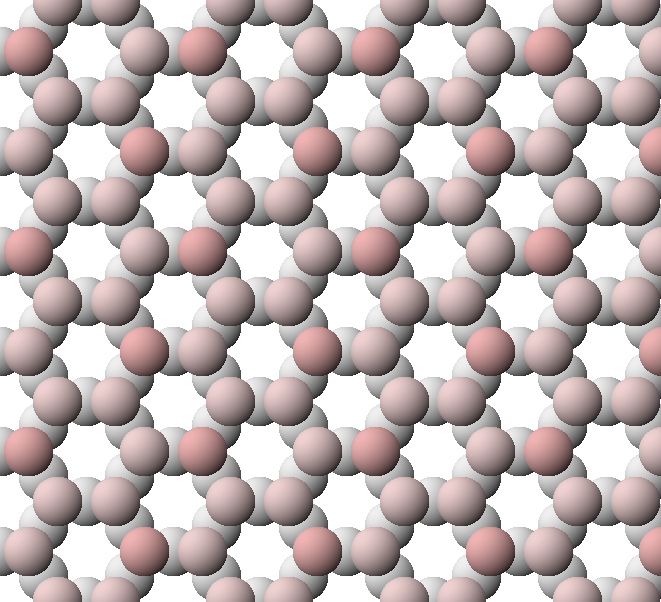
View of tetrahedral sheet structure of mica. The apical oxygen ions are tinted pink.

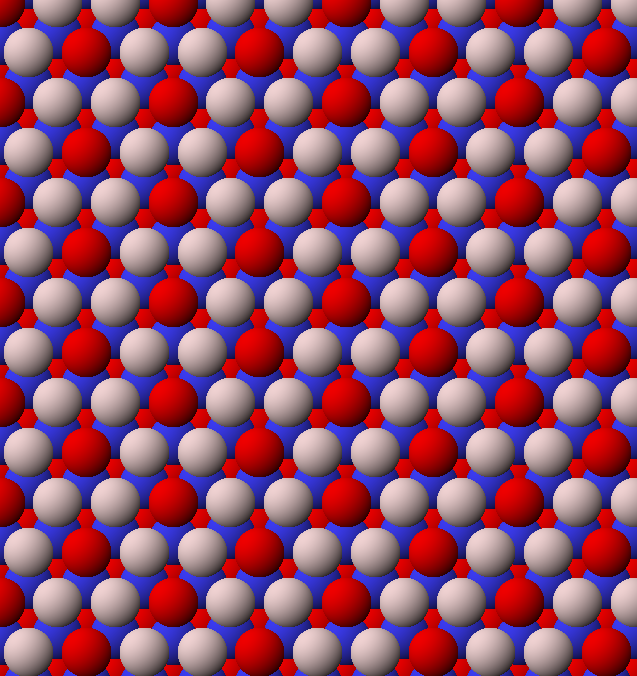
View of trioctahedral sheet structure of mica. The binding sites for apical oxygen are shown as white spheres.

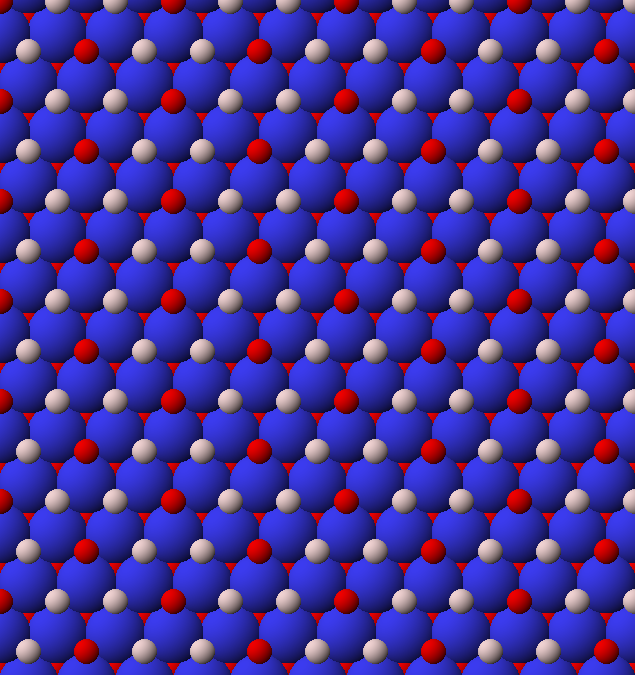
View of trioctahedral sheet structure of mica emphasizing octahedral sites

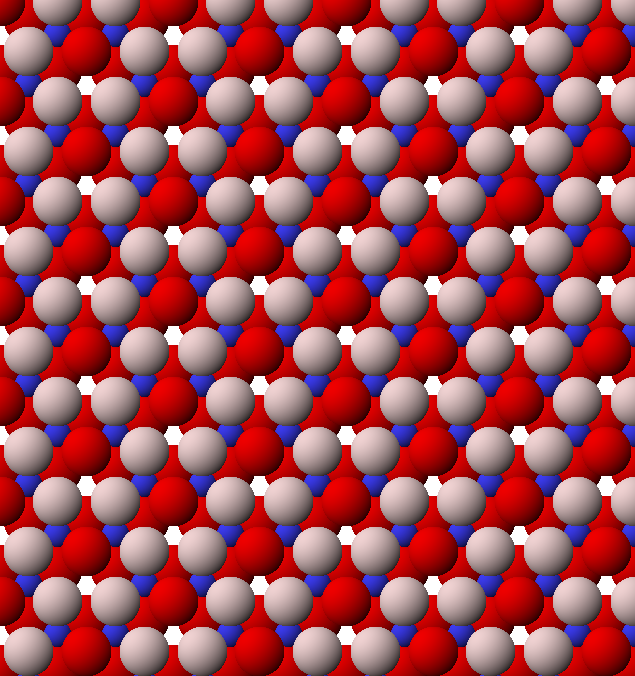
View of dioctahedral sheet structure of mica. The binding sites for apical oxygen are shown as white spheres.

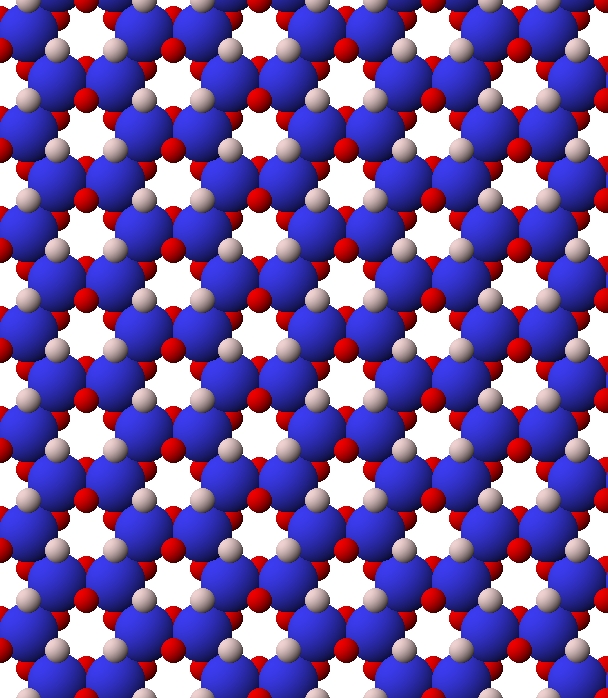
View of dioctahedral sheet structure of mica emphasizing octahedral sites

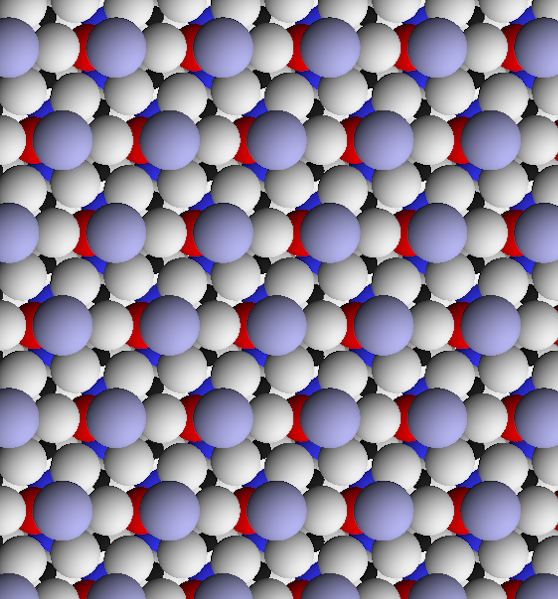
View of trioctahedral mica structure looking at surface of a single layer

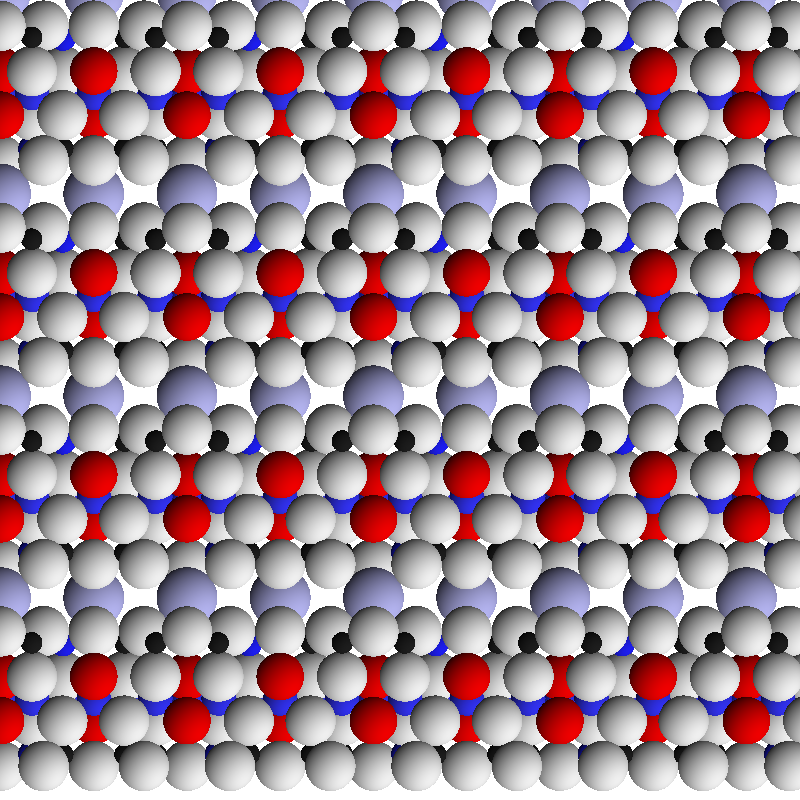
View of trioctahedral mica structure looking along sheets

== Classification ==
Chemically, micas can be given the general formula

X_{2}Y_{4–6}Z_{8}O_{20}(OH, F)_{4},

in which

X is K, Na, or Ca or less commonly Ba, Rb, or Cs;
Y is Al, Mg, or Fe or less commonly Mn, Cr, Ti, Li, etc.;
Z is chiefly Si or Al, but also may include Fe^{3+} or Ti.

Structurally, micas can be classed as dioctahedral (Y = 4) and trioctahedral (Y = 6). If the X ion is K or Na, the mica is a common mica, whereas if the X ion is Ca, the mica is classed as a brittle mica.

=== Dioctahedral micas ===
- Muscovite
- Paragonite

Brittle micas:

- Margarite

=== Trioctahedral micas ===
Common micas:

- Biotite
- Lepidolite
- Phlogopite
- Zinnwaldite

Brittle micas:

- Clintonite

=== Interlayer-deficient micas ===
Very fine-grained micas, which typically show more variation in ion and water content, are informally termed "clay micas". They include:

- Hydro-muscovite with H_{3}O^{+} along with K in the X site;
- Illite with a K deficiency in the X site and correspondingly more Si in the Z site;
- Phengite with Mg or Fe^{2+} substituting for Al in the Y site and a corresponding increase in Si in the Z site.

Sericite is the name given to very fine, ragged grains and aggregates of white (colorless) micas.

== Occurrence and production ==
Mica production

Mica embedded in metamorphic rock

Mica is widely distributed and occurs in igneous, metamorphic and sedimentary regimes. Large crystals of mica used for various applications are typically mined from granitic pegmatites.

The largest documented single crystal of mica (phlogopite) was found in Lacey Mine, Ontario, Canada; it measured 10 m × 4.3 m × 4.3 m (33 ft × 14 ft × 14 ft) and weighed about 330 tonnes (320 long tons; 360 short tons). Similar-sized crystals were also found in Karelia, Russia.

Scrap and flake mica is produced all over the world. In 2010, the major producers were Russia (100,000 tonnes), Finland (68,000 t), the United States (53,000 t), South Korea (50,000 t), France (20,000 t) and Canada (15,000 t). The total global production was 350,000 t, although no reliable data were available for China. Most sheet mica was produced in India (3,500 t) and Russia (1,500 t). Flake mica comes from several sources: the metamorphic rock called schist as a byproduct of processing feldspar and kaolin resources, from placer deposits, and pegmatites. Sheet mica is considerably less abundant than flake and scrap mica, and is occasionally recovered from mining scrap and flake mica. The most important sources of sheet mica are pegmatite deposits. Sheet mica prices vary with grade and can range from less than $1 per kilogram for low-quality mica to more than $2,000 per kilogram for the highest quality.

In Madagascar and India, it is also mined artisanally, in poor working conditions and with the help of child labour.

== Uses ==
The commercially important micas are muscovite and phlogopite, which are used in a variety of applications.

=== Useful properties ===
Mica's value is based on its unique physical properties: the crystalline structure of mica forms layers that can be split or delaminated into thin sheets usually causing foliation in rocks. These sheets are chemically inert, dielectric, elastic, flexible, hydrophilic, insulating, lightweight, platy, reflective, refractive, resilient, and range in opacity from transparent to opaque. Mica is stable when exposed to electricity, light, moisture, and extreme temperatures. It has superior electrical properties as an insulator and as a dielectric, and can support an electrostatic field while dissipating minimal energy in the form of heat; it can be split very thin (0.025 to 0.125 millimeters or thinner) while maintaining its electrical properties, has a high dielectric breakdown, is thermally stable to 500 °C (932 °F), and is resistant to corona discharge. Muscovite, the principal mica used by the electrical industry, is used in capacitors that are ideal for high frequency and radio frequency. Phlogopite mica remains stable at higher temperatures (to 900 °C (1,650 °F)) and is used in applications in which a combination of high-heat stability and electrical properties is required. Muscovite and phlogopite are used in sheet and ground forms.

=== Ground mica ===
The leading use of dry-ground mica in the US is in the joint compound for filling and finishing seams and blemishes in gypsum wallboard (drywall). The mica acts as a filler and extender, provides a smooth consistency, improves the workability of the compound, and provides resistance to cracking. In 2008, joint compounds accounted for 54% of dry-ground mica consumption. In the paint industry, ground mica is used as a pigment extender that also facilitates suspension, reduces chalking, prevents shrinking and shearing of the paint film, increases the resistance of the paint film to water penetration and weathering and brightens the tone of colored pigments. Mica also promotes paint adhesion in aqueous and oleoresinous formulations. Consumption of dry-ground mica in paint, the second-ranked use, accounted for 22% of the dry-ground mica used in 2008.

Ground mica is used in the well-drilling industry as an additive to drilling fluids. The coarsely ground mica flakes help prevent the loss of circulation by sealing porous sections of the drill hole. Well-drilling muds accounted for 15% of dry-ground mica use in 2008. The plastics industry used dry-ground mica as an extender and filler, especially in parts for automobiles as lightweight insulation to suppress sound and vibration. Mica is used in plastic automobiles fascia and fenders as a reinforcing material, providing improved mechanical properties and increased dimensional stability, stiffness, and strength. Mica-reinforced plastics also have high-heat dimensional stability, reduced warpage, and the best surface properties of any filled plastic composite. In 2008, consumption of dry-ground mica in plastic applications accounted for 2% of the market. The rubber industry used ground mica as an inert filler and mold release compound in the manufacture of molded rubber products such as tires and roofing. The platy texture acts as an anti-blocking, anti-sticking agent. Rubber mold lubricant accounted for 1.5% of the dry-ground mica used in 2008. As a rubber additive, mica reduces gas permeation and improves resiliency.

Dry-ground mica is used in the production of rolled roofing and asphalt shingles, where it serves as a surface coating to prevent sticking of adjacent surfaces. The coating is not absorbed by freshly manufactured roofing because mica's platy structure is unaffected by the acid in asphalt or by weather conditions. Mica is used in decorative coatings on wallpaper, concrete, stucco, and tile surfaces. It also is used as an ingredient in flux coatings on welding rods, in some special greases, and as coatings for core and mold release compounds, facing agents, and mold washes in foundry applications. Dry-ground phlogopite mica is used in automotive brake linings and clutch plates to reduce noise and vibration (asbestos substitute); as sound-absorbing insulation for coatings and polymer systems; in reinforcing additives for polymers to increase strength and stiffness and to improve stability to heat, chemicals, and ultraviolet (UV) radiation; in heat shields and temperature insulation; in industrial coating additive to decrease the permeability of moisture and hydrocarbons; and in polar polymer formulations to increase the strength of epoxies, nylons, and polyesters.

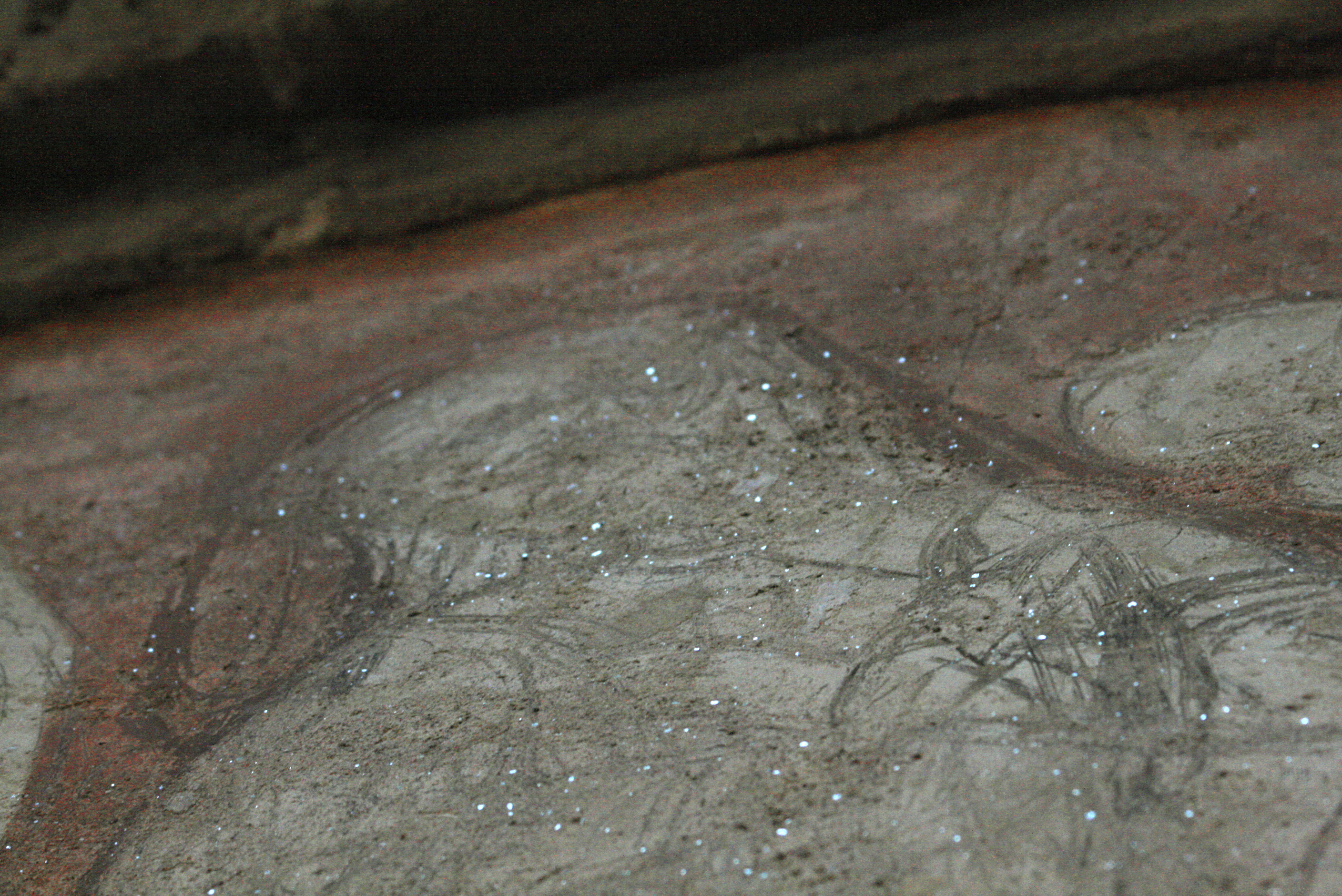
Mica flakes embedded in a fresco for glitter

=== Paints and cosmetics ===
Wet-ground mica, which retains the brilliance of its cleavage faces, is used primarily in pearlescent paints by the automotive industry. Many metallic-looking pigments are composed of a substrate of mica coated with another mineral, usually titanium dioxide (TiO_{2}). The resultant pigment produces a reflective color depending on the thickness of the coating. These products are used to produce automobile paint, shimmery plastic containers, and high-quality inks used in advertising and security applications. In the cosmetics industry, its reflective and refractive properties make mica an important ingredient in blushes, eye liner, eye shadow, foundation, hair and body glitter, lipstick, lip gloss, mascara, moisturizing lotions, and nail polish. Some brands of toothpaste include powdered white mica. This acts as a mild abrasive to aid the polishing of the tooth surface and also adds a cosmetically pleasing, glittery shimmer to the paste. Mica is added to latex balloons to provide a colored shiny surface.

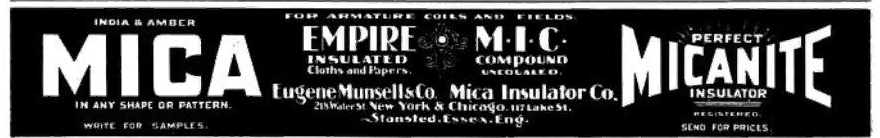
Micanite advertisement, 1899

=== Built-up mica ===
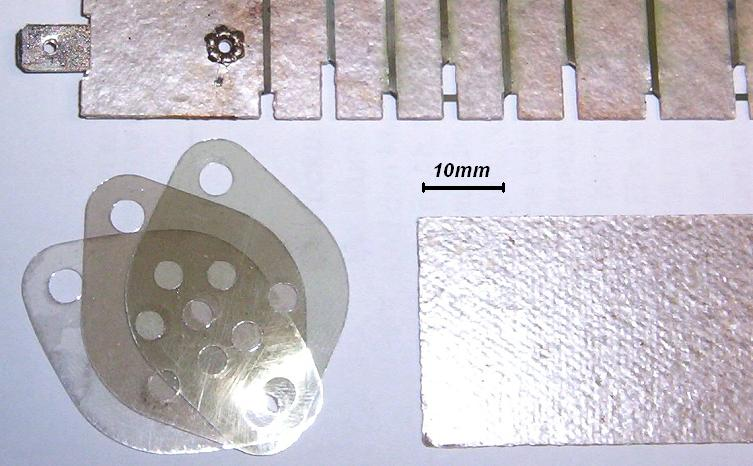
Micanite or mica for isolated mounting of transistors (top, right) and mica discs

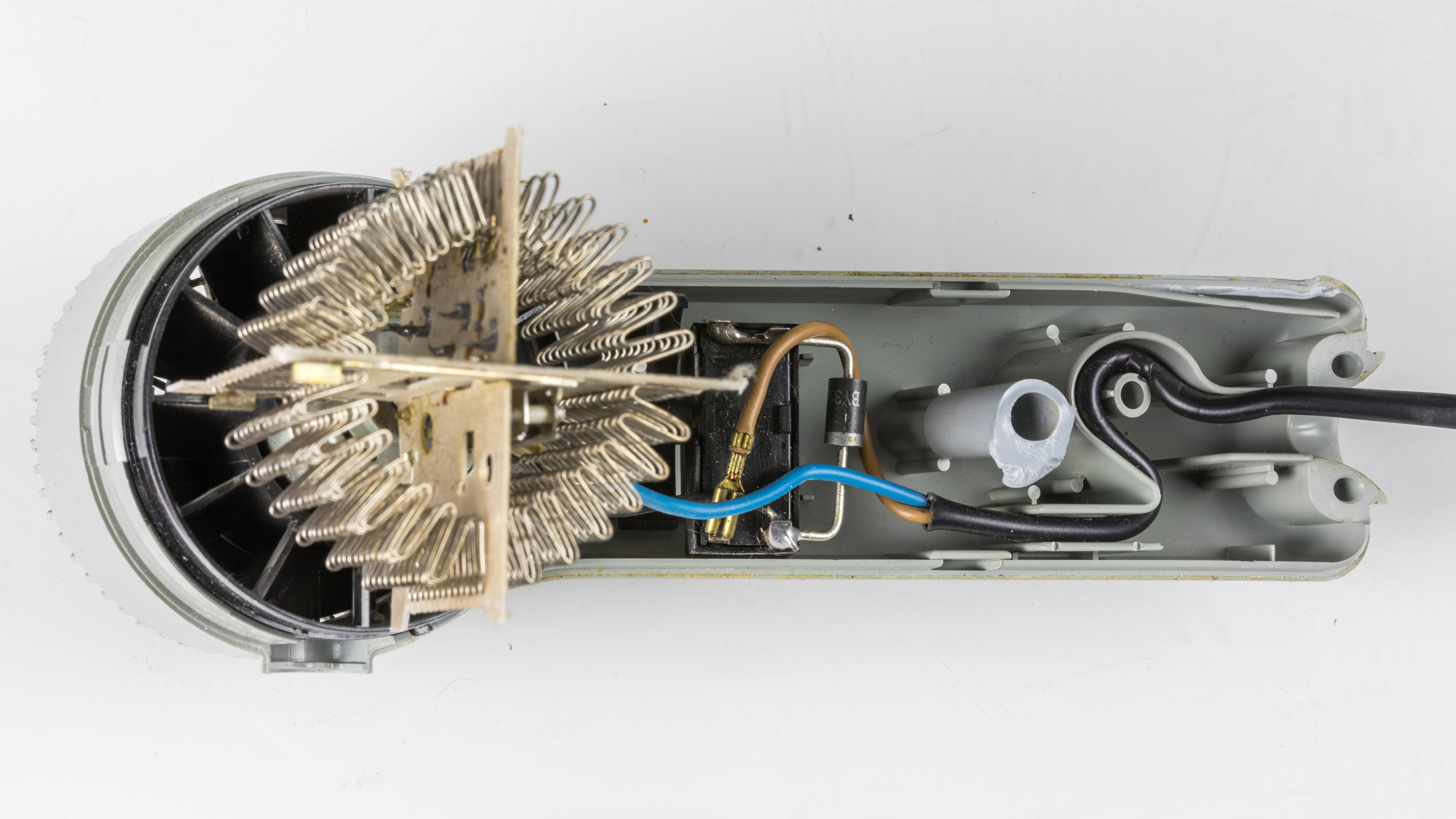
Nichrome wire, used in heating elements, is often wrapped around sheets of mica.

Muscovite and phlogopite splittings can be fabricated into various built-up mica products, also known as micanite. Produced by mechanized or hand setting of overlapping splittings and alternate layers of binders and splittings, built-up mica is used primarily as an electrical insulation material. Mica insulation is used in high-temperature and fire-resistant power cables in aluminium plants, blast furnaces, critical wiring circuits (for example, defence systems, fire and security alarm systems, and surveillance systems), heaters and boilers, lumber kilns, metal smelters, and tanks and furnace wiring. Specific high-temperature mica-insulated wire and cable are rated to work for up to 15 minutes in molten aluminium, glass, and steel. Major products are bonding materials; flexible, heater, molding, and segment plates; mica paper; and tape. Flexible plate is used in electric motor and generator armatures, field coil insulation, and magnet and commutator core insulation. Mica consumption in flexible plates was about 21 tonnes in 2008 in the US. A heater plate is used where high-temperature insulation is required. The molding plate is sheet mica from which V-rings are cut and stamped for use in insulating the copper segments from the steel shaft ends of a commutator. The molding plate is also fabricated into tubes and rings for insulation in armatures, motor starters, and transformers. Segment plate acts as insulation between the copper commutator segments of direct-current universal motors and generators. Phlogopite built-up mica is preferred because it wears at the same rate as the copper segments. Although muscovite has a greater resistance to wear, it causes uneven ridges that may interfere with the operation of a motor or generator. Consumption of segment plates was about 149 t in 2008 in the US. Some types of built-up mica have bonded splittings reinforced with cloth, glass, linen, muslin, plastic, silk, or special paper. These products are very flexible and are produced in wide, continuous sheets that are either shipped, rolled, or cut into ribbons or tapes, or trimmed to specified dimensions. Built-up mica products may also be corrugated or reinforced by multiple layering. In 2008, about 351 t of built-up mica was consumed in the US, mostly for molding plates (19%) and segment plates (42%).

=== Sheet mica ===
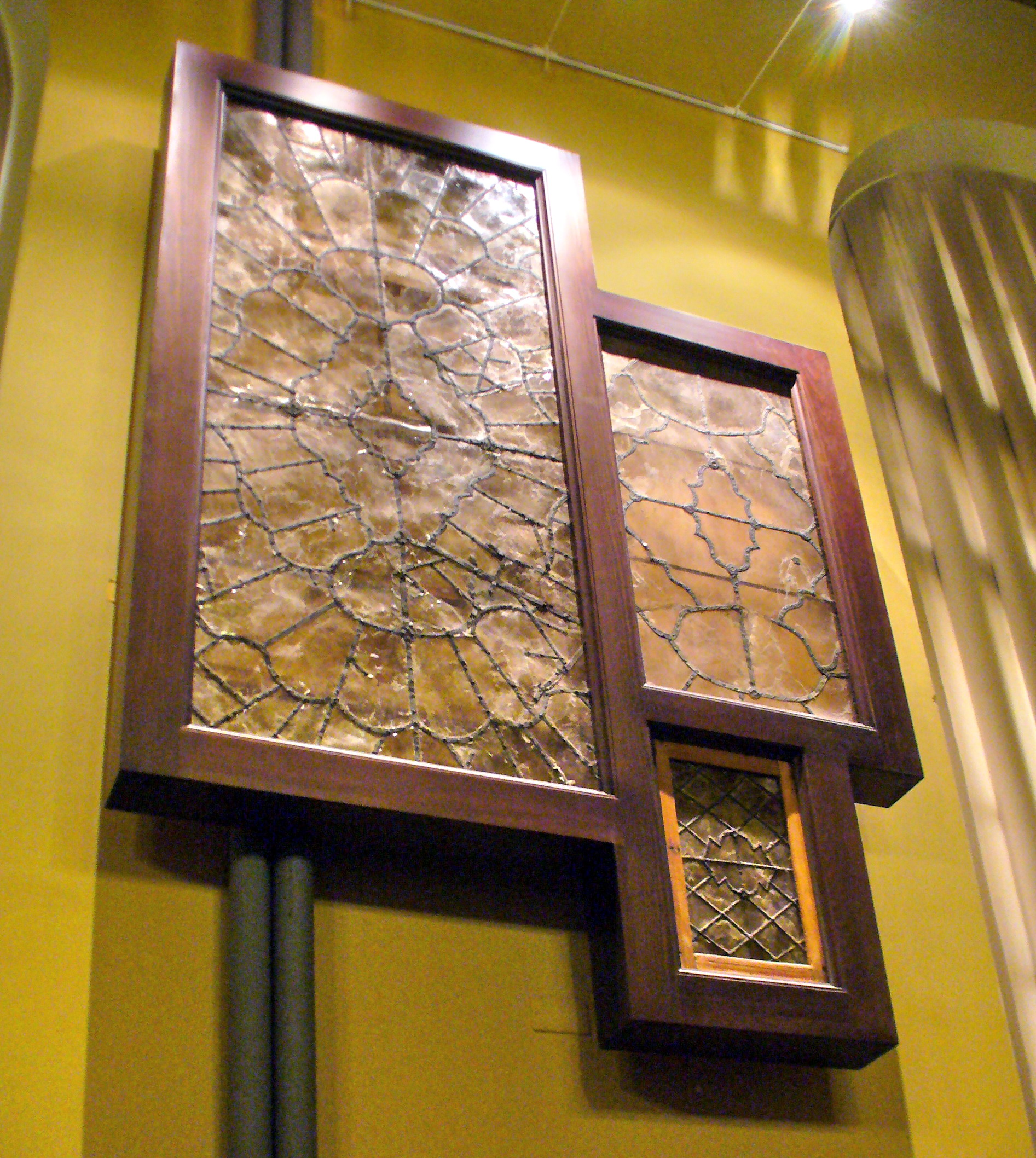
Muscovite windows

Sheet mica is a versatile and durable material widely used in electrical and thermal insulation applications. It exhibits excellent electrical properties, heat resistance, and chemical stability.

Technical grade sheet mica is used in electrical components, electronics, atomic force microscopy and as window sheets. Other uses include diaphragms for oxygen-breathing equipment, marker dials for navigation compasses, optical filters, pyrometers, thermal regulators, stove and kerosene heater windows, radiation aperture covers for microwave ovens, and micathermic heater elements. Mica is birefringent and is therefore commonly used to make quarter and half wave plates. Specialized applications for sheet mica are found in aerospace components in air-, ground-, and sea-launched missile systems, laser devices, medical electronics and radar systems. Mica is mechanically stable in micrometer-thin sheets which are relatively transparent to radiation (such as alpha particles) while being impervious to most gases. It is therefore used as a window on radiation detectors such as Geiger–Müller tubes.

In 2008, mica splittings represented the largest part of the sheet mica industry in the United States. Consumption of muscovite and phlogopite splittings was about 308 t in 2008. Muscovite splittings from India accounted for essentially all US consumption. The remainder was primarily imported from Madagascar.

Small squared pieces of sheet mica are also used in the traditional Japanese Kōdō ceremony to burn incense: A burning piece of coal is placed inside a cone made of white ash. The sheet of mica is placed on top, acting as a separator between the heat source and the incense, to spread the fragrance without burning it.

==== Electrical and electronic ====
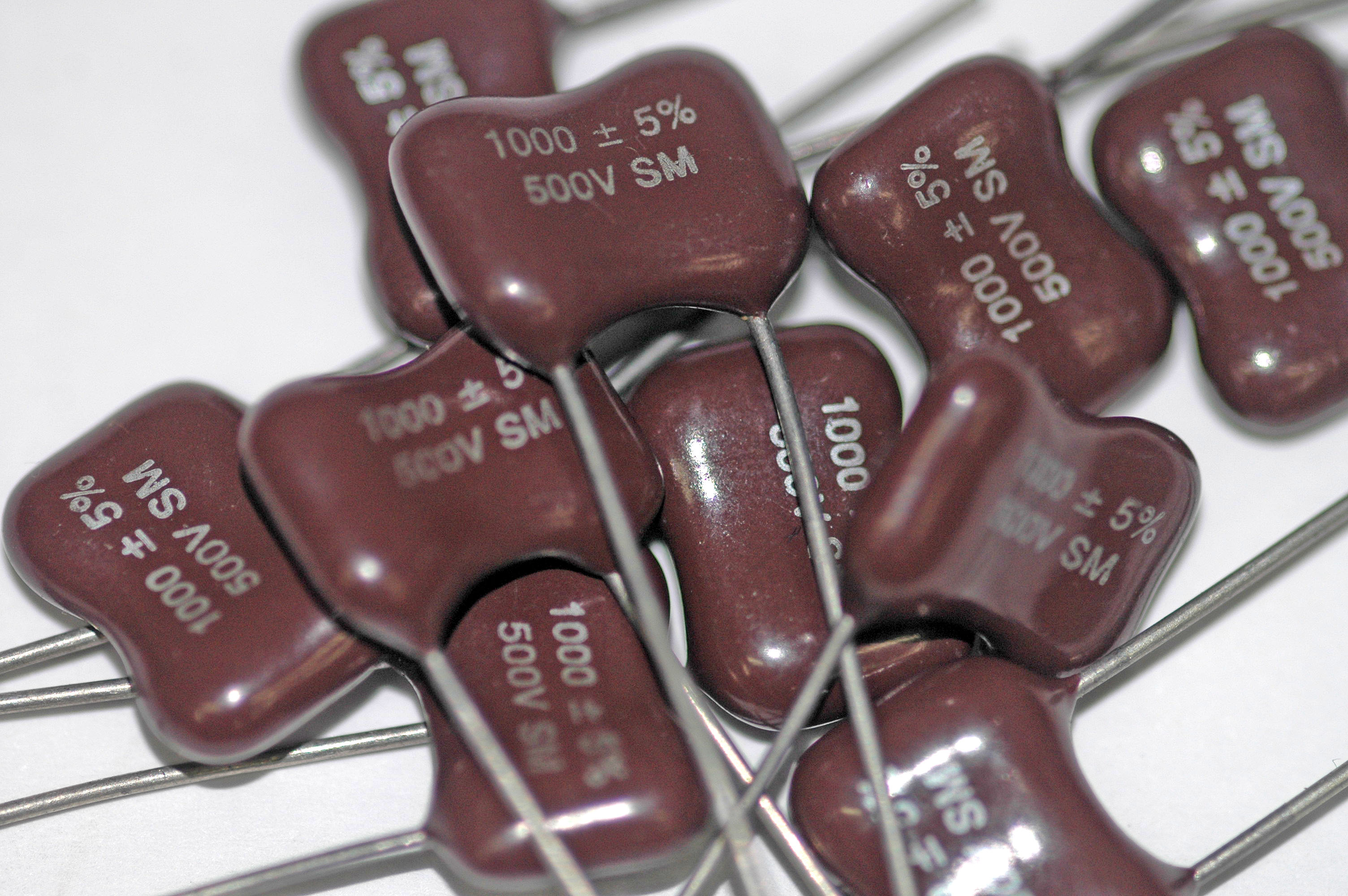
Silver mica capacitors

Sheet mica is used principally in the electronic and electrical industries. Its usefulness in these applications is derived from its unique electrical and thermal properties and its mechanical properties, which allow it to be cut, punched, stamped, and machined to close tolerances. Specifically, mica is unusual in that it is a good electrical insulator at the same time as being a good thermal conductor. The leading use of block mica is as an electrical insulator in electronic equipment. High-quality block mica is processed to line the gauge glasses of high-pressure steam boilers because of its flexibility, transparency, and resistance to heat and chemical attack. Only high-quality muscovite film mica, which is variously called India ruby mica or ruby muscovite mica, is used as a dielectric in capacitors. The highest quality mica film is used to manufacture capacitors for calibration standards. The next lower grade is used in transmitting capacitors. Receiving capacitors use a slightly lower grade of high-quality muscovite.

Mica sheets are used to provide structure for heating wire (such as in Kanthal or Nichrome) in heating elements and can withstand up to 900 °C (1,650 °F).

Single-ended self-starting lamps are insulated with a mica disc and contained in a borosilicate glass gas discharge tube (arc tube) and a metal cap. They include the sodium-vapor lamp that is the gas-discharge lamp in street lighting.

==== Atomic force microscopy ====
Another use of mica is as a substrate in the production of ultra-flat, thin-film surfaces, e.g. gold surfaces. Although the deposited film surface is still rough due to deposition kinetics, the back side of the film at the mica-film interface is ultra-flat once the film is removed from the substrate. Freshly-cleaved mica surfaces have been used as clean imaging substrates in atomic force microscopy, enabling for example the imaging of bismuth films, plasma glycoproteins, membrane bilayers, and DNA molecules.

==== Peepholes ====
Thin transparent sheets of mica were used for peepholes in boilers, lanterns, stoves, and kerosene heaters because they were less likely to shatter than glass when exposed to extreme temperature gradients. Such peepholes were also fitted in horse-drawn carriages and early 20th-century cars, where they were called isinglass curtains.

== Etymology ==
The word mica is derived from the Latin word mica, meaning a crumb, and probably influenced by micare, to glitter.

== Early history ==
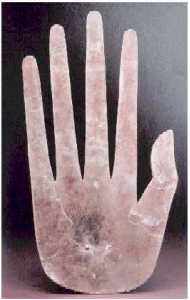
Hand carved from mica from the Hopewell tradition

Human use of mica dates back to prehistoric times. Mica was known to ancient Indian, Egyptian, Greek, Roman, and Chinese civilizations, as well as the Aztec civilization of the New World.

The earliest use of mica has been found in cave paintings created during the Upper Paleolithic period (40,000 BC to 10,000 BC). The first hues were red (iron oxide, hematite, or red ochre) and black (manganese dioxide, pyrolusite), though black from juniper or pine carbons has also been discovered. White from kaolin or mica was used occasionally.

A few kilometers northeast of Mexico City stands the ancient site of Teotihuacan. Mica was found in the noble palace complex "Viking Group" during an excavation led by Pedro Armillas between 1942 and 1944. Later, a second deposit was located in the Xalla Complex, another palatial structure east of Street of the Dead. There is a claim mica was found within the Pyramid of the Sun, which originates from Peter Tompkins in his book Mysteries of the Mexican Pyramids, but this is not yet proven.

Natural mica was and still is used by the Taos and Picuris Pueblos Indians in north-central New Mexico to make pottery. The pottery is made from weathered Precambrian mica schist and has flecks of mica throughout the vessels. Tewa Pueblo Pottery is made by coating the clay with mica to provide a dense, glittery micaceous finish over the entire object.

Mica flakes (called abrak in Urdu and written as ابرک) are also used in Pakistan to embellish women's summer clothes, especially dupattas (long light-weight scarves, often colorful and matching the dress). Thin mica flakes are added to a hot starch water solution, and the dupatta is dipped in this water mixture for 3–5 minutes. Then it is hung to air dry.

=== Mica powder ===
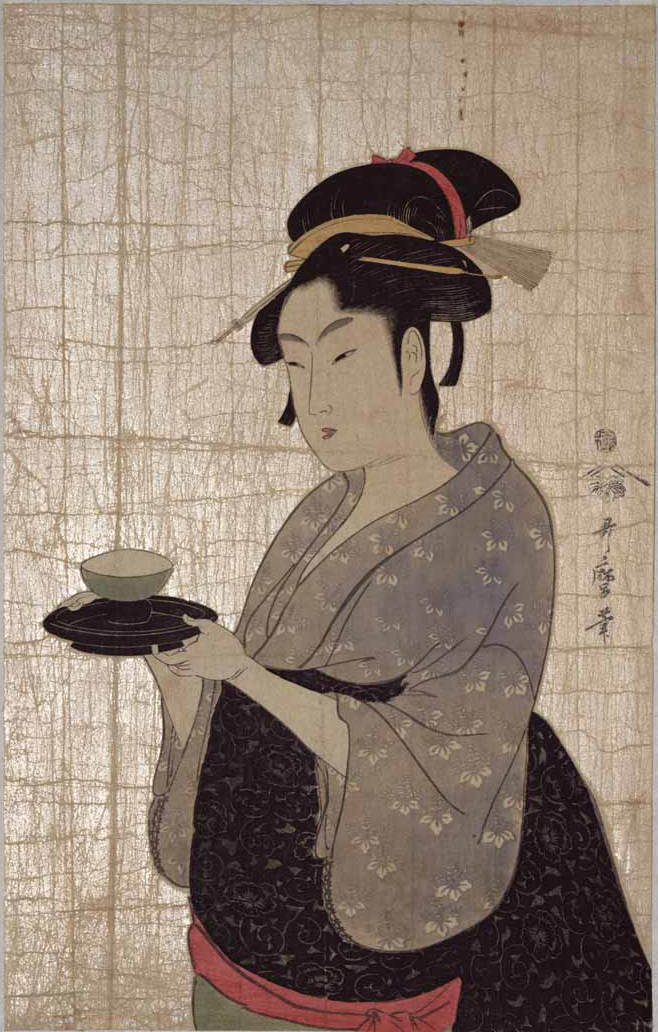
Kirazuri printing technique adds mica powder to the gelatin solution as adhesive, here printed on the background.

Throughout the ages, fine powders of mica have been used for various purposes, including decorations. Powdered mica glitter is used to decorate traditional water clay pots in India, Pakistan and Bangladesh; it is also used on traditional Pueblo pottery, though not restricted to use on water pots in this case. The gulal and abir (colored powders) used by North Indian Hindus during the festive season of Holi contain fine crystals of mica to create a sparkling effect. The majestic Padmanabhapuram Palace, 65 km (40 mi) from Trivandrum in India, has colored mica windows.

Mica powder is also used as a decoration in traditional Japanese woodblock printmaking, as when applied to wet ink with gelatin as thickener using kirazuri technique and allowed to dry, it sparkles and reflects light. Earlier examples are found among paper decorations, with the height as the Nishi Honganji 36 Poets Collection, codices of illuminated manuscripts in and after ACE 1112. For metallic glitter, Ukiyo-e prints employed very thick solution either with or without color pigments stencilled on hairpins, sword blades or fish scales on carp streamers (鯉のぼり, Koinobori).

The soil around Nishio in central Japan is rich in mica deposits, which were already mined in the Nara period. Yatsuomote ware is a type of local Japanese pottery from there. After an incident at Mount Yatsuomote a small bell was offered to soothe the kami. Katō Kumazō started a local tradition where small ceramic zodiac bells (きらら鈴) were made out of local mica kneaded into the clay, and after burning in the kiln the bell would make a pleasing sound when rung.

=== Medicine ===
Ayurveda, the Hindu system of ancient medicine prevalent in India, includes the purification and processing of mica in preparing Abhraka bhasma, which is claimed as a treatment for diseases of the respiratory and digestive tracts.

== Health impact ==
Mica dust in the workplace is regarded as a hazardous substance for respiratory exposure above certain concentrations.

=== United States ===
The Occupational Safety and Health Administration (OSHA) has set the legal limit (permissible exposure limit) for mica exposure in the workplace as 20 million parts per cubic foot (706,720,000 parts per cubic meter) over an 8-hour workday. The National Institute for Occupational Safety and Health (NIOSH) has set a recommended exposure limit (REL) of 3 mg/m^{3} respiratory exposure over an 8-hour workday. At levels of 1,500 mg/m^{3}, mica is immediately dangerous to life and health.

=== Ireland ===
The Irish defective block crisis relates to mica in construction blocks.

== Substitutes ==
Some lightweight aggregates, such as diatomite, perlite, and vermiculite, may be substituted for ground mica when used as filler. Ground synthetic fluorophlogopite, a fluorine-rich mica, may replace natural ground mica for uses that require thermal and electrical properties of mica. Many materials can be substituted for mica in numerous electrical, electronic, and insulation uses. Substitutes include acrylate polymers, cellulose acetate, fiberglass, fishpaper, nylon, phenolics, polycarbonate, polyester, styrene, vinyl-PVC, and vulcanized fiber. Mica paper made from scrap mica can be substituted for sheet mica in electrical and insulation applications.

== In popular culture ==
Herman Melville mentions isinglass mica and isinglass dried fish bladder uses in Chapter 68 of Moby Dick, comparing whale skin and blubber's appearance to mica's. In the musical Oklahoma!, the song "The Surrey With the Fringe on Top" describes the surrey as having "isinglass curtains you can roll right down," as mica was commonly used for windows in vehicle side screens. Mentioned in The Book of Life by Deborah Harkness, "her scales fell like isinglass", in reference to the scales of a fire drake named Corra, and in Mark Twain's The Gilded Age where he describes a furnace door which "framed a small square of isinglass..." (chapter seven). It is also mentioned in the first paragraph of Willa Cather’s The Song of the Lark: “the isinglass sides of the hard-coal burner were aglow.” Isinglass is also written about in Little Town on the Prairie (Little House on the Prairie series book 7, Chapter 17: The Sociable) by Laura Ingalls Wilder, "...a tall, shining heater with isinglass windows stood at its center, the chairs around the walls were all of polished woods...", in describing a room that the 'sociable' was being held in.

== See also ==
- Mica fish

== Sources ==
This article incorporates public domain material from Mica. United States Geological Survey.
