= Cannon operation =

Handling and firing a cannon

The operation of cannons required specialised crewmen and gunners, who were first enlisted by the Spanish military in the 14th century. The nature of cannon-operation often depended upon the size of the cannon, and whether it was breech-loading or muzzle-loading. English cannons of the late 14th century became mobile, while the largest cannons (such as the heavy siege cannons of the Ottoman Turks or the Jaivana cannons of India) required huge crews to transport and operate them.

As the "giant gun" trend disappeared in Europe, in favour of lighter, more manoeuvrable pieces in larger numbers, cannon-operating crews became smaller, heralding the early use of true field artillery. While the medieval Dardanelles Gun had required 200 men just to operate it, an 18th-century English cannon required only a dozen men, including two gunners, while during the Napoleonic Wars, five gunners were used.

== Overview ==
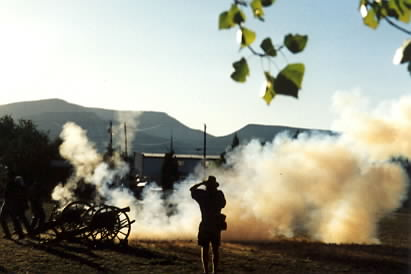
Cannons in a Civil War re-enactment: Large amounts of gunpowder often affected visibility, and gunners hoped for a strong wind.

Firing of a field gun of the early 17th century with a linstock

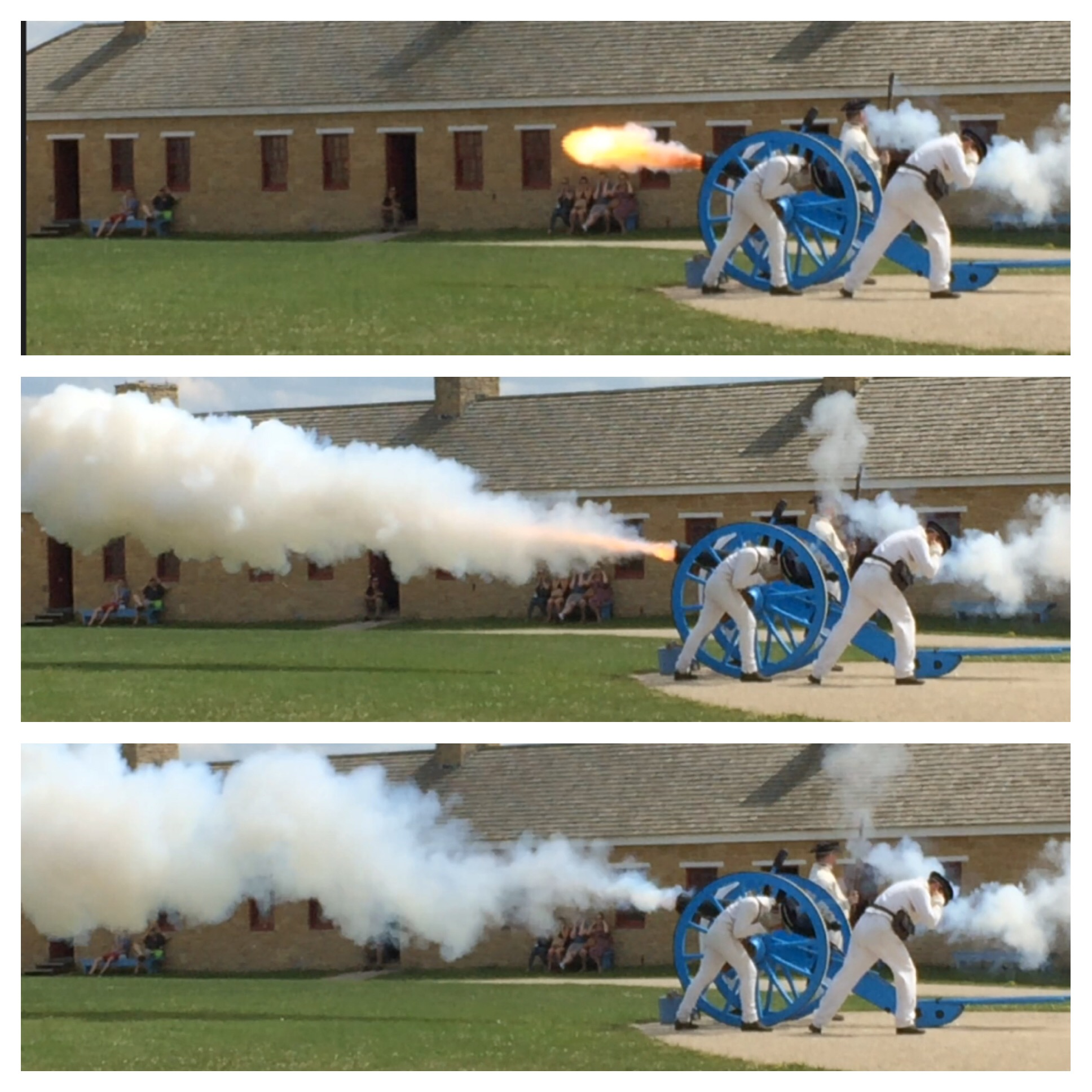
Firing of a 6-pound cannon

Cannon operation is described by the 1771 Encyclopædia Britannica. Each cannon would be manned by two gunners, six soldiers, and four officers of the artillery. The right gunner was to prime the piece and load it with powder, while the left gunner would fetch the powder from the magazine and keep ready to fire the cannon at the officer's command. Three soldiers stood on each side of the cannon, to ram and sponge the cannon, and hold the ladle. The second soldier on the left was charged with providing 50 rounds.

Prior to loading, the cannon would be well-cleaned with a sponge to remove all sparks, filth, and dirt. Next, the powder was added, followed by a wad of paper or hay, and then the ball was thrown-in. After ramming, the cannon would be aimed with the elevation set using a quadrant and a plummet. At 45 degrees, the ball had the utmost range– about ten times the gun's level range. Any angle above the horizontal line was called random-shot. The officer of artillery had to ensure that the cannon was diligently served. Water was available to dip the sponges in and cool the pieces every ten or twelve rounds.

In the late 1770s, it was said that a 24-pounder could fire 90 to 100 shots per day in summer, or 60 to 75 in winter. However, French artillery officers managed to have a cannon fire 150 shots daily during a siege. A 16 or 12-pounder would fire a little more, because they were more easily served. The Encyclopædia Britannica mentions "some occasions where 200 shots have been fired from these pieces in the space of nine hours, and 138 in the space of five".

=== Cannon instruments ===
Essential parts of a cannon: 1. the projectile or cannonball (shot); 2. gunpowder; 3. touch hole (or vent) in which the fuse or other ignition device is inserted

Several instruments are used to service a medieval style cannon, as noted in the 1771 Encyclopædia Britannica.

- The "sponge" is a long staff or rammer with a piece of fleece sheep or lambskin wound about its end, to serve for scouring the cannon when discharged, before it is to be charged with fresh powder. This cleaning prevents any spark or fire from remaining in the piece, which would endanger the life of the loading crew. Sponges were the most commonly used cannon cleaning instruments.
- A "wad-screw" is two points of iron in the shape of a corkscrew, to extract the wad out of the piece. Used when the cannon has to be unloaded or dirt must be removed.
- The "lantern" or "ladle" serves to carry the powder into the piece. It consists of a wooden box appropriated to the caliber of the piece for which it is intended with a length of a caliber and a half with its vent, and of a piece of copper nailed to the box at the height of a half caliber. This lantern must have three calibers and a half in length, and two calibers in breadth, being rounded on the end to load the ordinary pieces.
- The "primer" must contain a pound of powder at least, and is used to prime the pieces.
- A "rammer" is a round piece of wood, commonly called a box, which serves to drive home the powder and ball to the breech. It is fastened to a stick twelve feet long, for the pieces from twelve to thirty-three pounders, and ten for the eight and four pounders.
- The "botefeux" is used to hold a winding of match with which to fire the cannon. May be a stick two or three feet long with a split to hold one end of the match.
- A "priming iron" is a pointed iron rod, used to clear the touch hole of the pieces of powder or dirt. Also used to pierce the cartridge, that it may sooner take fire.
- The "quoin of mire" are pieces of wood with a notch on the side to put the fingers on, to draw them back or push them forward, when the gunner points his pieces. They are placed on the sole of the carriage.

Leaden plates are used to cover the touch-hole, when the piece is charged, to keep dirt from entering the touch-hole.

== History ==
=== Pre-Renaissance cannons ===
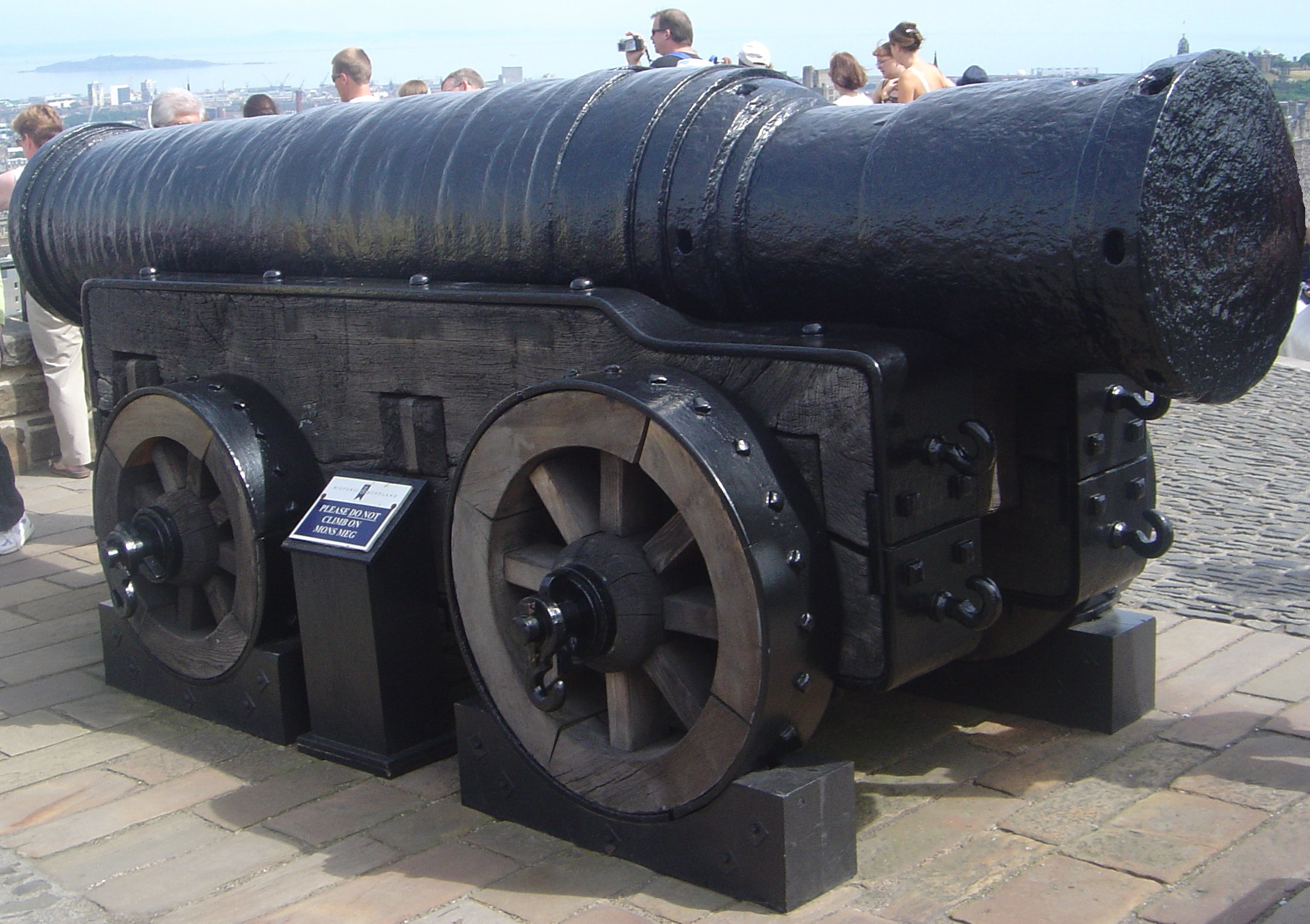
Mons Meg, a 15th-century cannon

In 1248, Roger Bacon's "Opus Maior" described a gunpowder recipe, and recognised its military use:

We can, with saltpeter and other substances, compose artificially a fire that can be launched over long distances... By only using a very small quantity of this material much light can be created accompanied by a horrible fracas. It is possible with it to destroy a town or an army ... In order to produce this artificial lightning and thunder it is necessary to take saltpeter, sulfur, and Luru Vopo Vir Can Utriet.

In Spain, the specialised nature of cannon operation was first recognised, and the Spanish kings at the initial stages enlisted the help of Moorish experts:

The first artillery-masters on the Peninsula probably were Moors in Christian service. The king of Navarre had a Moor in his service in 1367 as maestro de las guarniciones de artilleria. The Morisques of Tudela at that time had fame for their capacity in reparaciones de artilleria.

Certainly cannons were used at the Battle of Crécy, but how they were deployed, or how many crewmen were assigned to them, is unclear. It is known that in the 1380s however, the "ribaudekin" clearly became mounted upon wheels, offering greater mobility for its operation. Wheeled gun-carriages became more commonplace by the end of the 15th century, and cannons were more often cast in bronze, rather than created via banding iron sections together. There were still the logistical problems both of transporting and of operating the cannons, and as many as three dozen horses and oxen may have been required to move some of the great cannons of the period. Each cannon had its crew of gunner, matrosses, and drivers, and a group of "pioneers" were assigned to level to path ahead. Even then, the gunpowder mixture that was used was unstable, and could easily separate-out into sulfur, saltpetre , and charcoal during transport.

Once on site, they would be fired at ground level behind a hinged timber shutter, to provide some protection to the artillery crew. When the Ottoman Turks used stationary "falcons" at the 1422 Siege of Constantinople, for example, they had to build barricades "in order to receive… the stones of the bombard". Timber wedges were used to control the barrel's elevation. The majority of medieval cannons were breechloaders, although there was still no effort to standardise calibres.

Larger cannons were used in greater numbers during the Fall of Constantinople: Sultan Mehmet II used 68 Hungarian-made cannons, the largest of which was 26 ft (7.9 m) long and weighed 20 t (20 long tons; 22 short tons); this fired a 1,200 lb (540 kg) cannonball, and required an operating crew of 200 men, as well as 70 oxen and 10,000 men just to transport them. For the defenders, the Walls of Constantinople could not be adapted for the operation of artillery, and towers were not good gun emplacements. There was even worry that the largest Byzantine cannons could cause more damage to their own walls than the Turkish cannons could. The changing needs of cannon operation thus led to the development of trace italienne of Italy and the Tudors' Device Forts in England, using specially built cannon batteries to their greatest effect.

=== Renaissance to early 19th century ===
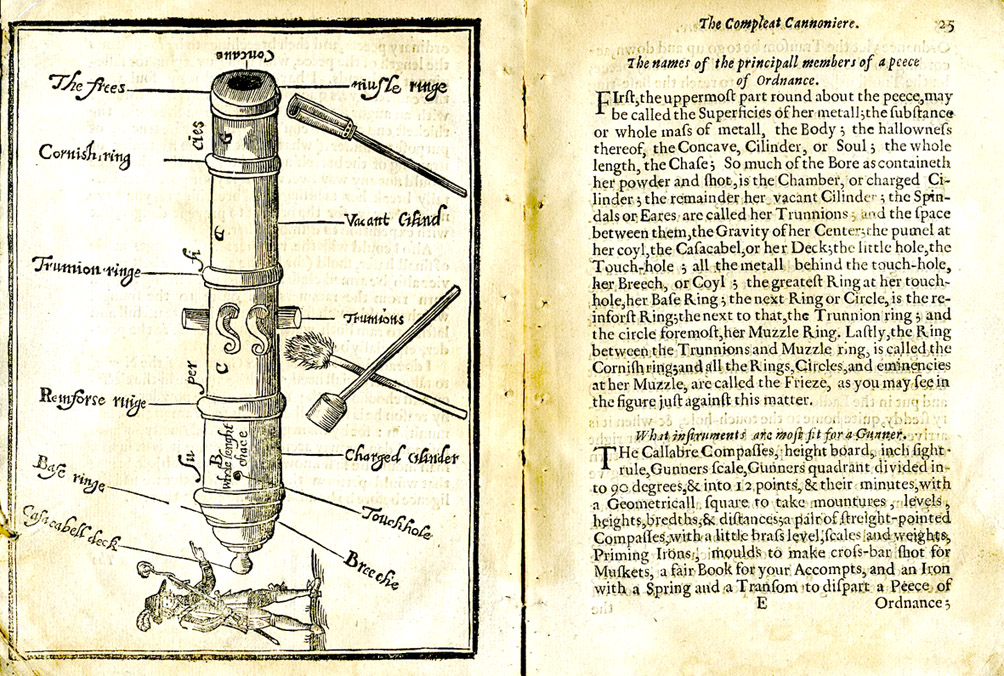
Parts of a cannon, described in John Roberts, The Compleat Cannoniere, London, 1652.

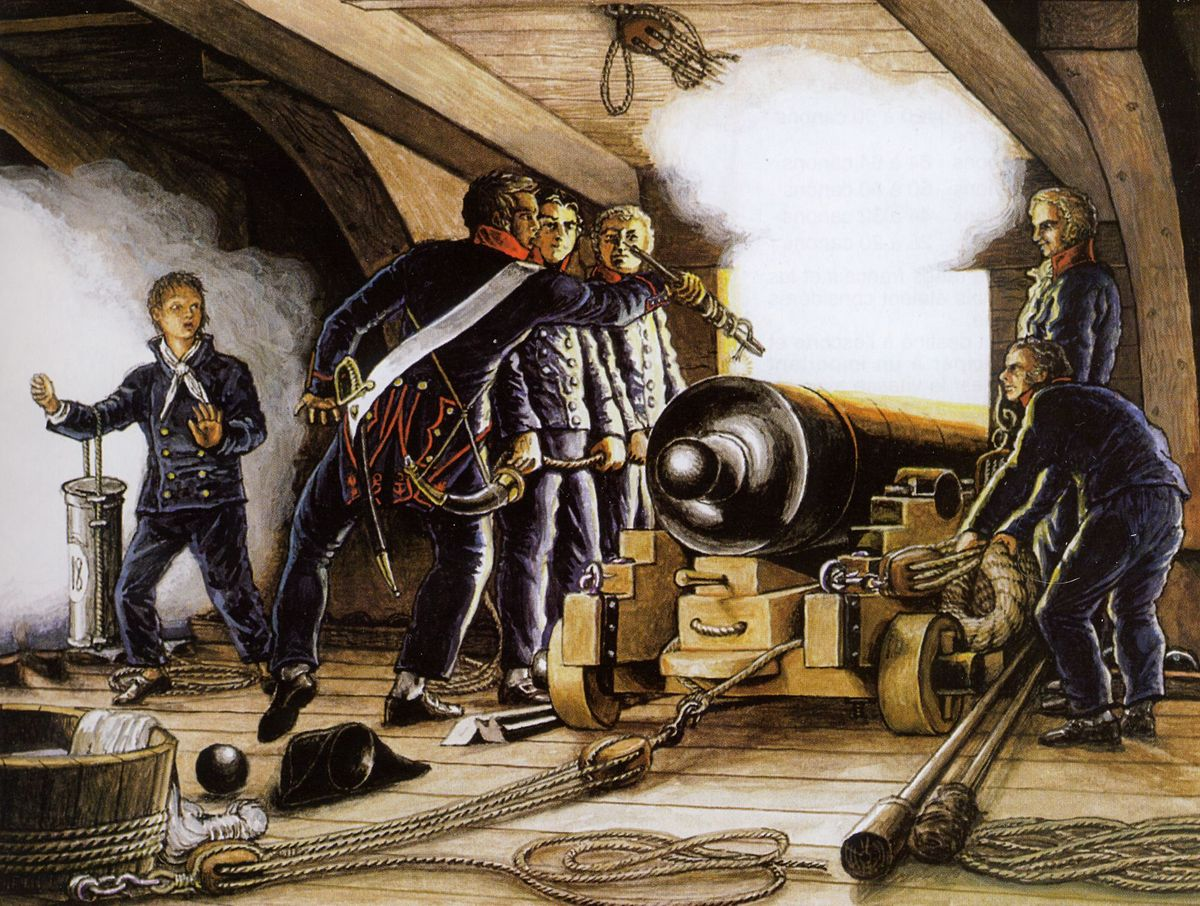
Firing of an 18-pounder aboard a French ship.

While "coal and sulfur" had been recognised as the best weapon for naval warfare as early as 1260, cannons saw their first real naval use in large numbers during the Renaissance. The French "culverin", adapted for naval use by the English military in the late 16th century, was of relatively long barrel and light construction, and fired solid round shot projectiles at long ranges along a flat trajectory. The Tudor carrack the Mary Rose was equipped with 78 cannons (91 after an upgrade in the 1530s), and was one of the first ships to have the theoretic ability to fire a full cannon broadside.

Its Scottish counterpart, the Great Michael, mounted 36 great guns and 300 lighter guns, with 120 gunners.

In Niccolò Machiavelli's The Art of War, the Italian Renaissance writer observed that "small pieces of cannon… do more damage than heavy artillery. The best remedy against the latter is making a resolute attack upon it as soon as possible…" As was the case at Flodden in 1513, the Scottish siege-artillery could only fire one round per minute, while the English field guns could fire twice or even thrice as many. Guns also had to be moved back into position after recoil, and the speed of this would reflect the gunners' experience.

A description of the Gunner's techniques is given during the English Civil War period (mid-17th century) by John Roberts, covering the modes of calculation and the ordnance pieces themselves, in his work The Compleat Cannoniere, printed London 1652 by W. Wilson and sold by George Hurlock (Thames Street). In the 17th century, large wheels were typical of field cannons, as opposed to the lighter carriages that were used for fortress and naval cannons. At coastal fortifications, furnaces would be used for heating red-hot shot, to be used against ships. The lower tier of English ships of the line at this time were usually equipped with demi-cannons— naval guns which fired a 32-pound solid shot. A full cannon fired a 42-pound shot, but these were discontinued by the 18th century because they were seen as too unwieldy.

The introduction of carronades at the end of the 18th century also resulted in guns that were easier to handle and required less than half the gunpowder of long guns, allowing fewer men to crew them than long guns mounted on naval garrison carriages.

During the Napoleonic Wars, a British gun team consisted of 5 numbered gunners - fewer crew than needed in the previous century. The No.1 was the gun commander, and a sergeant, who aimed the gun. The No.2 was the "spongeman" who cleaned the bore with the sponge dampened with water between shots; the intention being to quench any remaining embers before a fresh charge was introduced. The No.3, the loader, inserted the bag of powder and then the projectile. The No.2 then used a rammer, or the sponge reversed, to drive it in. At the same time, the No.4 ("ventsman") pressed his thumb on the vent hole to prevent a draught that might fan a flame. The charge loaded, the No.4 pricked the bagged charge through the vent hole and filled the vent with powder. At the No.1's command the No.5 would fire the piece with his slow match. Friction primers replaced slow match ignition by the mid-19th century.
