= Thermalite =

Fireworks component

Thermalite is a specific type of fuse used in pyrotechnic applications. The product was designed to be used in cross matching safety fuses of the Bickford type. As safety fuse is designed to neither give nor take fire through the heavy fuse jacket, ignition may be achieved by punching a hole perpendicular to and through a safety fuse powder core, threading a piece of Thermalite or similar igniter cord through the hole, then gently squeezing the safety fuse with pliers or similar to bring the powder core into contact with the igniter cord. The Thermalite could be ignited by a match, or more certainly by a purpose made igniter, similar to a wire sparkler.

An expedient formerly used to ignite bickford style safety fuses was to split the end of a safety fuse, place a match head into the split and tie the split back together, holding the match head against the powder core. This technique was slower, cumbersome and more failure prone than piercing and cross matching. Also, a single length of igniter cord could pass through and serially ignite multiple pieces of safety fuse attached to various charges in more complex, multiple charge blasting schemes. This technique and the several burn rate types of igniter cord manufactured by ICI could be used to implement quite complex ignition sequences.

This fuse is used in high-power model rocketry as a means of simultaneously igniting multiple "clustered" rocket motors. A single flashbulb or flash pan is used to ignite pieces of Thermalite leading to each motor.

Thermalite comes in three burn rates identifiable by the colour of the fuse wrapping:

- Pink: slow (20 sec/foot)
- Green: medium (10 sec/foot)
- White: fast (5 sec/foot)

Thermalite igniter cords and connectors were manufactured in Quebec by ICA Canada Inc., however in November 1995 they ceased manufacturing igniter cord. Sources for thermalite are increasingly hard to come by and purchasing it by mail will usually require permits and licenses. As a result, those who want to use thermalite fuses will sometimes make their own.

== See also ==
- Artillery fuze
- Black match
- Fuse (explosives)
- Punk (fireworks)
- Safety fuse
- Slow match
