= Consumer fireworks =

Fireworks sold for use by the general public

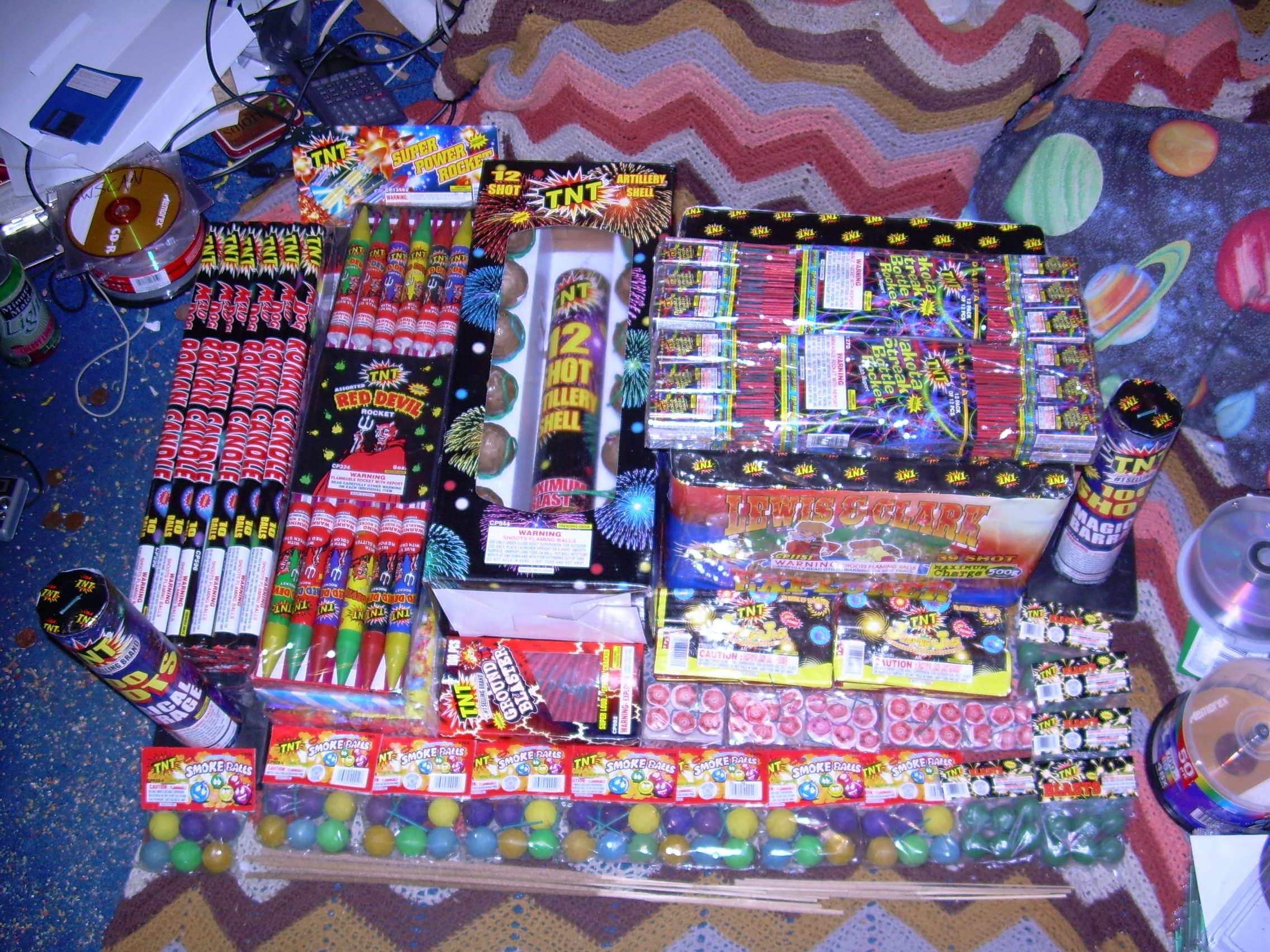
A selection of consumer-grade fireworks - rockets, artillery shells, smoke balls, and others

Consumer fireworks are fireworks sold for use by the general public. They are generally weaker in explosive power than the fireworks used in professional displays.

However, their use can be dangerous and lead to fires and accidents.

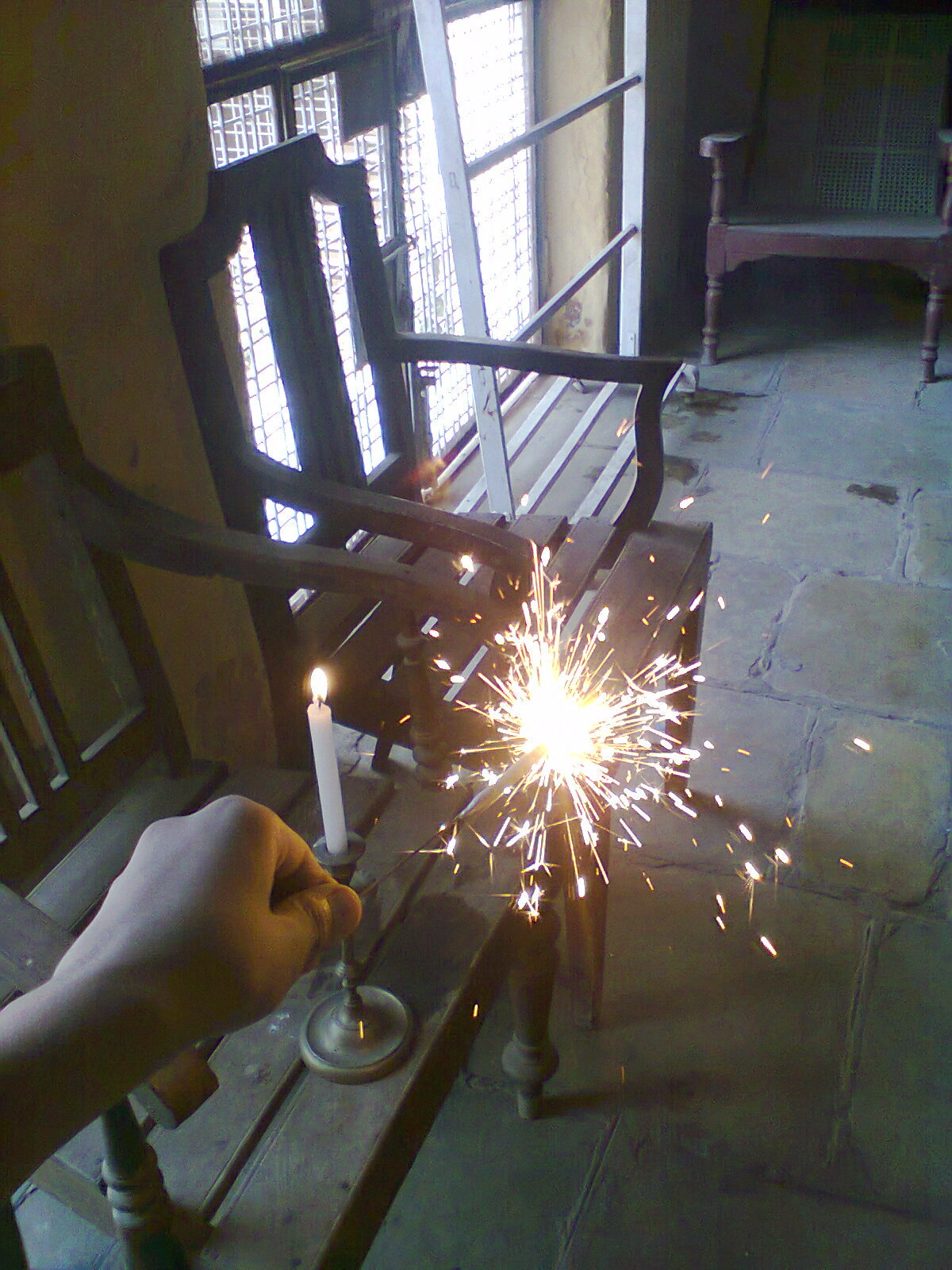
A sparkler firework lit by a candle

== Examples ==
Consumer fireworks are often quite small and can be classified into three groups: daytime, nighttime, and novelty fireworks.

=== Daytime fireworks ===
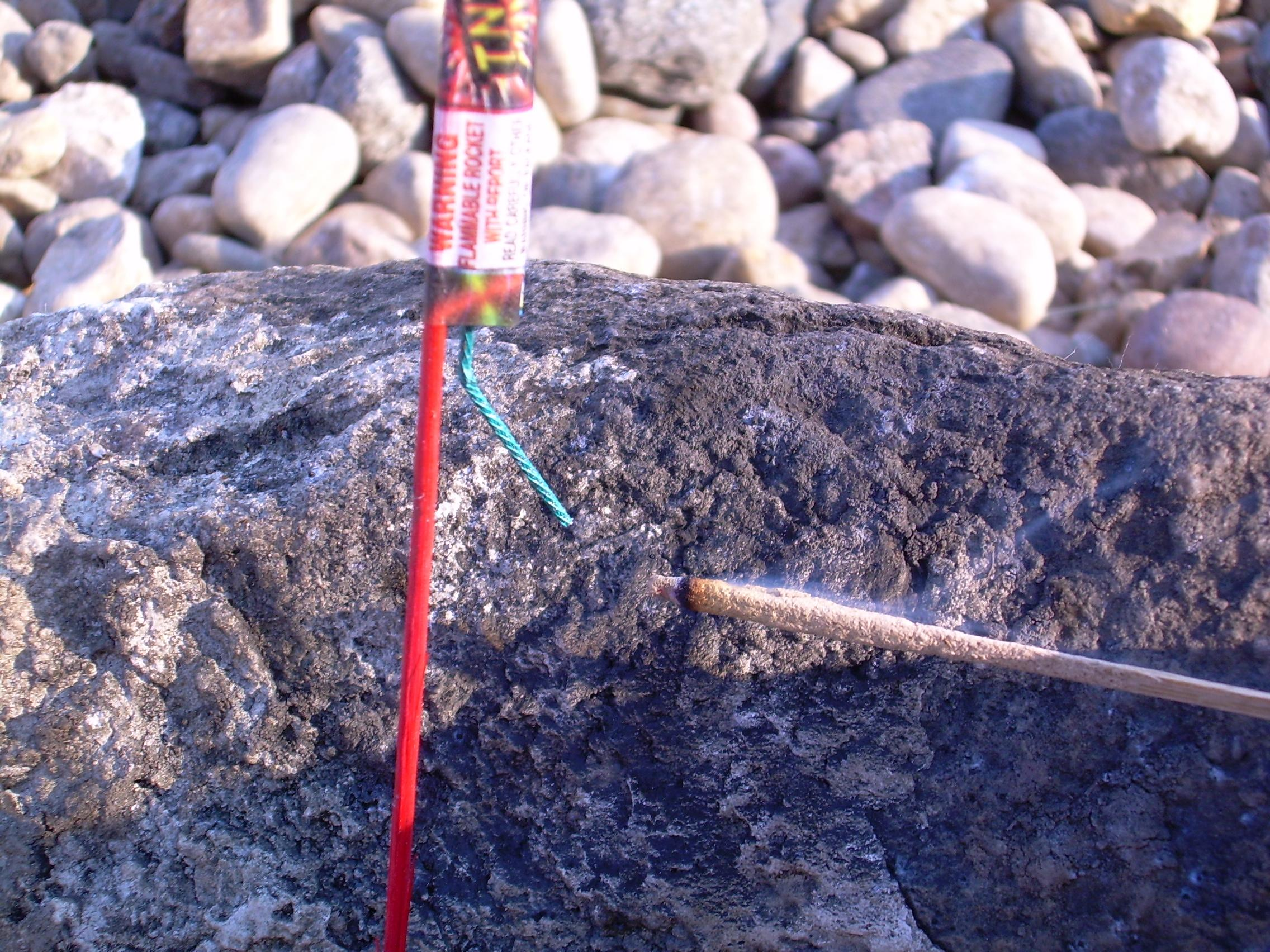
Using a punk to light a rocket

Daytime fireworks include most bottle rockets, smoke balls, firecrackers, and other fireworks that emit very little or no light. Some examples of daytime consumer fireworks include:

- Skyrocket — Launch into the air, sometimes with a high-pitched whistling sound, with a report at the end. Some varieties may emit sparks upon launch. Their sizes can range from an inch to about 6 inches (15 cm) long and 1/8 to 3/4 inch (3.2 to 19.1 mm) around, not including the stick. The smaller variety of these rockets are also commonly referred to as "Bottle Rockets" due to the commonality in which people use a bottle as a launching platform.
- Firecracker — An explosion occurs on the ground, often in a series. They range from 1 to 16,000+ on a single string.
- Smoke ball — Emits colored smoke for a few seconds. Colors typically include white, green, blue, yellow, orange, fuchsia, red and pink.
- Multiple Rocket Launcher — More commonly known as the "Saturn Missile Battery" typically launches a series of 16 to 800 small rockets (dependent on the firework purchased) with a high-pitched whistle each time, often with a report.
- Snake - a firework that, when lit, leaves a trail of ash.

=== Novelty fireworks ===
Novelty fireworks typically produce a much weaker explosion and sound. In some countries and areas where fireworks are illegal to use, they still allow these small, low grade fireworks to be used. A few examples include:

- Party Poppers — once a string is pulled to activate the charge, confetti is thrust into the air and produces a report.
- Snaps — a small paper bag typically filled with gravel and a few micrograms of silver fulminate will produce a noise when thrown at a hard surface or stepped on.
- Flying Lanterns (Sky lantern) — these paper lanterns float into the sky when lit. They emit a slight glow and are very commonly used at weddings and celebrations.
- Paper Tanks & Vehicles — when lit, these small paper vehicles emit sparks that cause them to move around on the ground and commonly produce a loud bang at the end.
- Party Bombs — a tube filled with toys which, when lit, shoots the toys into the air distributing them around the room. It is used in Switzerland (tischbombe).
- Ground Bloom Flowers — a small cylinder that spins on the ground and changes color, spinning in such a way that it resembles a flower. Could be described as a large Jumping Jack.
- Snakes (Black snake) — a small compressed pellet that, when lit, expands into a long snake-like object.

== Use ==
=== Tools ===
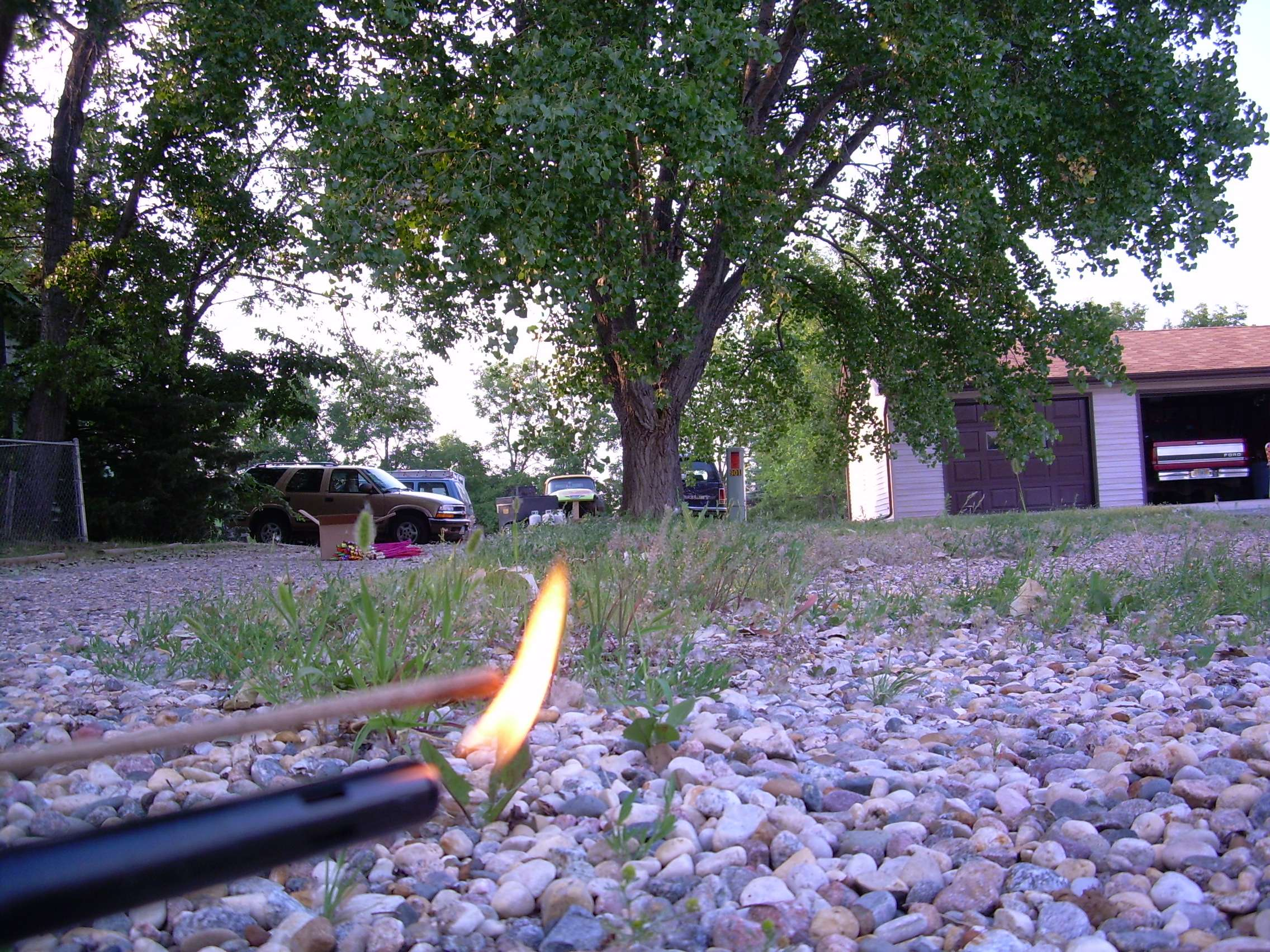
Using a lighter to light a punk

Consumer fireworks can be used with a variety of tools. One set of tools has to do with basic ignition, such as lighters, matches, and punks also known as a "port fire". By using a rack, one can ignite a series of different fireworks to create a scene. These sometimes allow for the finales seen at professional fireworks displays to be created using consumer fireworks. Racks can be used with multiple types of fireworks, such as aerial shells, fountains, Roman candles, and the newest class of fireworks, 500 gram repeaters. Other tools are involved with the setup of fireworks for later display, such as shovels, various hand tools, and spare visco fuses. The true scope of tools used with consumer fireworks is limited only by the displayer's imagination.

=== Lighting and launching ===
There are several ways by which fireworks can be ignited. The most basic of these is simply flame from a match, lighter or other devices that emits flames. Another way to light fireworks is by using a device called a punk. A punk is a long, thin piece of wood covered in a substance that burns very slowly, producing only heat, with no flame. A port fire is a smoldering compound as a powder compressed in a stiff paper tube. The most complicated method used to ignite consumer fireworks is to use electronic ignition. This is the preferred method of many professional pyrotechnicians worldwide because of the vast improvement in operator safety. There are a few electronic ignition (often called "e-fire") systems that use readily available materials.

== Regulations ==
Laws regarding consumer fireworks vary between countries and states.

=== Asia ===
In Asia, fireworks are commonly displayed during Lunar New Year. Traditionally, firecrackers were used to scare off evil spirits. Consumer fireworks can be found sold in some old-fashioned convenience stores.

==== India ====
In India, fireworks are primarily sold and lit during the Hindu festival of Diwali.

Due to the increasing levels of Air pollution in Delhi and the greater National Capital Region, the sale of fireworks were banned in the city by the Supreme Court during Diwali in 2017.

==== Philippines ====
In the Philippines, fireworks are primarily sold and lit during New Year's Eve.

=== Europe ===
==== Belgium ====
In Belgium, fireworks (except category 1) cannot be sold to anyone under the age of 16. Fireworks are available for purchase year round, but may only be used by police permission.

==== Finland ====
In Finland, fireworks (other than novelties and sparklers) are usually sold between Christmas and New Year's Day. It is legal to sell fireworks all year round (predominantly through online retailers). However, they may only be used on New Year's Eve from 6 pm to 2 am the following morning.

==== Germany ====
In Germany, fireworks (other than category 1) cannot be sold to anyone under the age of 18. Fireworks are available for purchase from many stores in the 3 days prior to New Year's Eve.

==== Iceland ====
In Iceland, fireworks are sold from December 28–31 and again on January 6.

==== Ireland ====
In Ireland, the import of consumer fireworks is strictly controlled, and the use of them must be overseen by a professional fireworks operator. This has led to considerable smuggling of fireworks from Northern Ireland, where regulations governing the sale of fireworks are more permissive.

==== Netherlands ====
In the Netherlands, fireworks (other than category 1) cannot be sold to anyone under the age of 16. They are only sold the last three days up until and including December 31. If one of those days is a Sunday, the sale period is moved to the 28 up until and including December 30. Fireworks may only be fired between 6 pm on New Year's Eve to 2 am the following day. Category 1 fireworks can be used all year round.

==== Norway ====
In Norway, fireworks cannot be sold to anyone under the age of 18. Class 1, 2 and 3 fireworks are for sale from December 27 to December 31. They may only be fired between 18:00h and 02:00h on New Year's Eve.

==== Poland ====
In Poland, fireworks cannot be sold to anyone under the age of 18. Fireworks are available for purchase year round but are primarily sold before New Year's Eve.

==== Romania ====
Romania also has a strict policy regarding fireworks. Only category 1 fireworks may be sold to the general public, and cannot be sold to anyone under 16 years old. Category 2 and above can only be sold to permit holders, and they can only be fired with police permission.

==== Sweden ====
In Sweden, fireworks cannot be sold to anyone under the age of 18. Categories 1 (Indoor), 2 (Garden) and 3 (Display) are available to the general public — with Category 4 (Professional) being restricted to permit holders. Fireworks are available for purchase year round but are primarily sold before New Year's Eve. In urban areas they may only be fired New Year's Eve, eastern eve and Walpurgis Night without a police permission. There may be time regulations on these days as well, but it depends on what municipality the user is in.

==== United Kingdom ====
In the United Kingdom, fireworks are subject to an age restriction of 16 (for Category 1 fireworks), and 18 (for Category 2 and 3 fireworks). Fireworks are not permitted to be set off between 11 pm and 7 am. Exceptions are made for New Year, Bonfire Night (5 November), the Chinese New Year and Diwali. Fireworks are available from specialist stores year round and their use is also permitted throughout the year within the specified time limits. The sale of Categories 1 (Indoor), 2 (Garden) and 3 (Display) are available to the general public — with Category 4 (Professional) being restricted to permit holders.

In the Isle of Man, outdoor firework displays are only legal if the relevant government department and local residents are advised prior to the event.

=== North America ===
==== Canada ====
Fireworks are regulated federally by the Explosives Regulatory Division (ERD), a department of Natural Resources Canada, and as such are responsible for the enforcement of regulations regarding consumer fireworks including manufacture, import/export, storage, and retail. It is legal in Canada to purchase a wide variety of consumer fireworks, such as Roman candles and star wheels, however all products offered for sale must be tested and approved by the ERD. Regulations regarding the dates when fireworks may be purchased, venues for operating fireworks, and other restrictions are set by the individual provinces and territories, and may vary widely from province to province or even between municipalities within the same province.

- Alberta: With recent changes to the Alberta Fire Code, the province now allows each municipality to regulate the sale and use of consumer fireworks. In Wood Buffalo, there is a total ban, meaning fireworks cannot be purchased or set off anywhere, while Edmonton allows fireworks, but only upon obtaining a permit first.
- British Columbia: In Metro Vancouver, fireworks can be bought and used in Vancouver, Burnaby, West Vancouver and North Vancouver without a permit, but they cannot be purchased in Surrey, Richmond, Langley, and Abbotsford, and much of the lower mainland.
- Ontario: Fireworks may be purchased in the two weeks preceding Canada Day and Victoria Day without a permit, and (barring local prohibitions) may be set off on the three days surrounding each holiday without a permit. Some GTA municipalities have allowed fireworks on the Hindu festival of Diwali.
- Quebec: St. Jean-Baptiste Day is a major fireworks celebration, however the focus is generally on display fireworks as opposed to consumer. Fireworks are prohibited year-round on the Island of Montreal, though allowed in much of the rest of the province.
- Atlantic Canada:fireworks are legal and can be used all year round.

==== United States ====
In the United States, the laws governing consumer fireworks vary widely from state to state, or from county to county. It is common for consumers to cross state and county lines in order to purchase types of fireworks which are outlawed in their home jurisdictions. Fireworks laws in urban areas typically limit sales or use by dates or seasons. Municipalities may have stricter laws than their counties or states do.

The Consumer Product Safety Commission defines what fireworks may be considered consumer fireworks. Consumer fireworks in the United States are limited to 500 grams (this was previously 350 grams until 17 years ago) of composition for pre-fused multi shot aerials known as cakes, and firecrackers may have up to 50 milligrams of flash powder. Reloadable shells are limited to 1.75" in diameter and can have a max of 60 grams of composition, and shells in pre-fused tubes are limited to 2.25" and are also limited to 60 grams of composition. Any fireworks that exceed these limits are not considered consumer fireworks and need an ATF license.

The American Pyrotechnics Association maintains a directory of state laws pertaining to fireworks.

One state — Massachusetts — bans the sale and use of all consumer fireworks, including novelties and sparklers.

Three states — Illinois, Ohio, and Vermont — permit the use of only wire or wood stick sparklers and other novelties, with Illinois and Vermont restricting sales to these same items.

Three states — Hawaii, Nevada, and Wyoming — allow each county to establish its own regulations.

For example, in Nevada, Clark County, where Las Vegas is located, allows residents to purchase and use only non-explosive and non-aerial consumer (safe and sane) fireworks during the 4th of July. Nye County allows persons 18 years of age or older to purchase and use safe and sane on private property. Aerial and explosive consumer fireworks are allowed, but only at designated areas. Esmeralda County allows the use of consumer fireworks on private property. Elko County allows the use of sparklers only. Most other counties in Nevada prohibit all types of consumer fireworks. These counties include Carson City, Churchill, Douglas, Eureka, Humboldt, Lander, Lincoln, Lyon, Mineral, Pershing, Storey, Washoe, and White Pine.

The following states allow the sale and use of non-aerial and non-explosive fireworks (also called "safe and sane") like novelties, fountains and sparklers, etc.: Arizona, California, Colorado, Connecticut, Delaware, Idaho, Maryland (except for some counties such as Montgomery County which only allows snap-and-pop noise makers, snakes, and party poppers), Minnesota, New York, New Jersey, North Carolina, Oregon, Rhode Island, Virginia, Wisconsin, and Washington D.C.

The following states permit the sale of all or most types of consumer fireworks to residents: Alabama, Alaska, Arkansas, Florida, Georgia, Iowa, Indiana, Kansas, Kentucky, Louisiana, Maine, Michigan, Mississippi, Missouri, Montana, Nebraska, New Hampshire, New Mexico, North Dakota, Oklahoma, Pennsylvania, South Carolina, South Dakota, Tennessee, Texas, Utah, Washington, and West Virginia. Many of these states have selling seasons around the 4th of July and/or Christmas and New Year's Eve; Utah also allows the sale and use of fireworks around Pioneer Day, July 24, celebrating the arrival of Mormon settlers to the valley of the Great Salt Lake in 1847. Some of these states also allow local laws or regulations to further restrict the types permitted or the selling seasons.

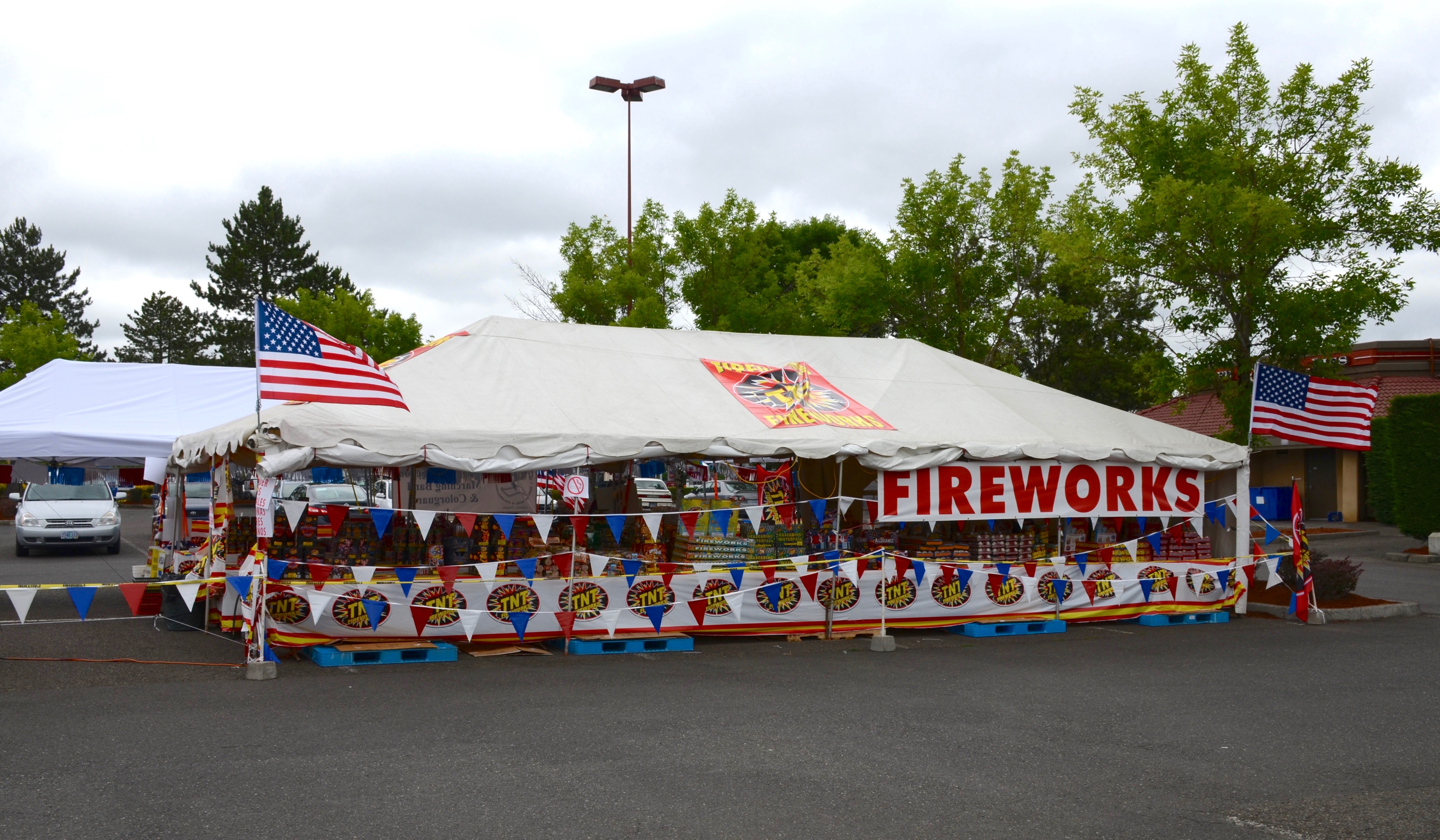
A fireworks stand in Oregon

California has very specific requirements for the types of consumer fireworks that can be sold to and used by residents. Even then each city can and often does place restrictions on sale and use.

Delaware Governor John Carney signed into law a bill on May 20, 2018, allowing sparklers and non-explosive, non-airborne novelty items. The use is allowed only on July 4 and December 31 each year with sales limited to the 30 days preceding their allowed use.

In Florida all consumer fireworks are legal as of (April 8, 2020) and are only permitted on the 4th of July, New Year's Eve, and New Year's Day although they can be sold to residents year-round. Each county is allowed to put forward their own regulations. Prior to the passage of this new law, all consumer fireworks could be purchased but buyers had to sign a form declaring intent to use the fireworks for agricultural purposes to scare birds away from crops. The new law also disallows HOAs from banning fireworks inside communities if the county permits usage.

Michigan legislators have passed and enrolled a bill that was signed by Governor Rick Snyder on December 13, 2011 allowing the sale and use of all consumer fireworks, however, sellers must pay a fee ($600–1000) to sell higher-power consumer fireworks, and a tax will be added to fireworks purchases.

In Minnesota only consumer fireworks that do not explode or fly through the air are permitted to be sold to and used by residents.

Missouri permits all types of consumer fireworks to be sold to residents with two selling seasons; June 20 – July 10 and December 20 – January 2. South Carolina permits all types of consumer fireworks except small rockets less than ½” in diameter and 3” long to be sold and used by residents year round.

New York Governor Andrew Cuomo signed into law a bill on November 21, 2014, allowing sparklers, party poppers, cone fountains and other novelty items to be sold, possessed, and used in the state of New York outside of New York City. Local governments must approve the sale and use of fireworks before people can legally use them. Although the use of fireworks is allowed year-round, the sale of fireworks, by registered businesses, is limited to a period of June 1 through July 5 and December 26 through January 2 each year.

Ohio permits the sale of some fireworks, but requires them to be transported out of state within 48 hours of the sale.

Washington allows consumer fireworks except firecrackers, sky rockets, missiles, and bottle rockets. Each county and city may regulate the use and possession of fireworks.

In Maine, fireworks can only be sold to people over 21 at fireworks only stores except for sparklers that can be sold at stores that sell other items except for propane dealers or other explosives.

Many states have stores with all types of consumer fireworks that sell to non-residents with the provision they are to remove the purchased fireworks from that state. This is why there are many stores selling fireworks in states like Ohio, Missouri, New Hampshire, Nevada and Wisconsin with all types of consumer fireworks, even though residents are limited or prohibited from buying or using those very same consumer fireworks unless they have the appropriate licenses and/or permits.

Many Native American Tribes have consumer fireworks stores on reservation lands that are exempt from state and local authority and will sell to people that are not in the tribe.

=== Oceania ===
==== Australia ====
In Australia, most states and territories outlaw fireworks for consumers. Tasmania, ACT and Northern Territory allow use with a permit (dependent on calendar date and circumstances). However, on July 1 for Territory Day, one can freely use fireworks without a permit in the Northern Territory.

Small firecrackers were legal in the ACT on the Queen's Official Birthday long weekend but were banned in 2009 due to safety concerns. However, small novelties such as party poppers and sparklers are legal across Australia.

==== New Zealand ====
In New Zealand fireworks cannot be sold to anyone under the age of 18 (previously 14), and may only be sold for the four days leading up to and including November 5. However, fireworks are able to be used at any time of the year (i.e.: there is no time restriction on when fireworks can be used, even though there is a restriction on the sales time of fireworks). The types of fireworks available to the public are multi-shot "cakes", Roman candles, single shot shooters, ground and wall spinners, fountains, cones, sparklers, and various novelties, such as smoke bombs and pharaoh's serpents. sales of fireworks have become increasingly restricted in recent years. Skyrockets, and other fireworks where the firework itself flies were banned in 1994. Firecrackers and Bangers were banned in 1993. As of 2007, sparklers may only be purchased no more than 50 at a time in packs with other fireworks. This is due to the popularity of sparkler bombs.

=== South America ===
==== Argentina ====
In Argentina, fireworks were prohibited from public shows in 2019 by a national decree based in article 14 of national constitution and demands of organizations of animal protection and parents of autistic children. Otherwise, most fireworks are completely legal to sell all year round.

==== Chile ====
In Chile fireworks are restricted for consumer use and can only be seen in professional shows (except on New Year 2020/2021 in response to the COVID-19 pandemic). The prohibition came at the request of organizations dealing with burnt children, many of the accidents being caused by unsupervised use of fireworks.

==== Colombia ====
In Colombia any sale of pyrotechnic items or fireworks and balloons is prohibited. Colombian legislation totally prohibits fireworks containing white phosphorus. Violators will receive a fine that can reach US$2,500.
