= Saucisson (pyrotechnics) =

Primitive type of fuse

In early military engineering, a saucisson (French for a large, dry-filled sausage) was a primitive type of fuse, consisting of a long tube or hose of cloth or leather, typically about an inch and half in diameter (37 mm), damp-proofed with pitch and filled with black powder. It was normally laid in a protective wooden trough, and ignited by use of a torch or slow match. Saucissons were used to fire fougasses, petards, mines and camouflets.

Very long fascines were also called saucissons.

Later, in early 20th century jargon of mining, a saucisson referred to the flexible casings used for explosives in mine operations.
