= Petard =

Small explosive device

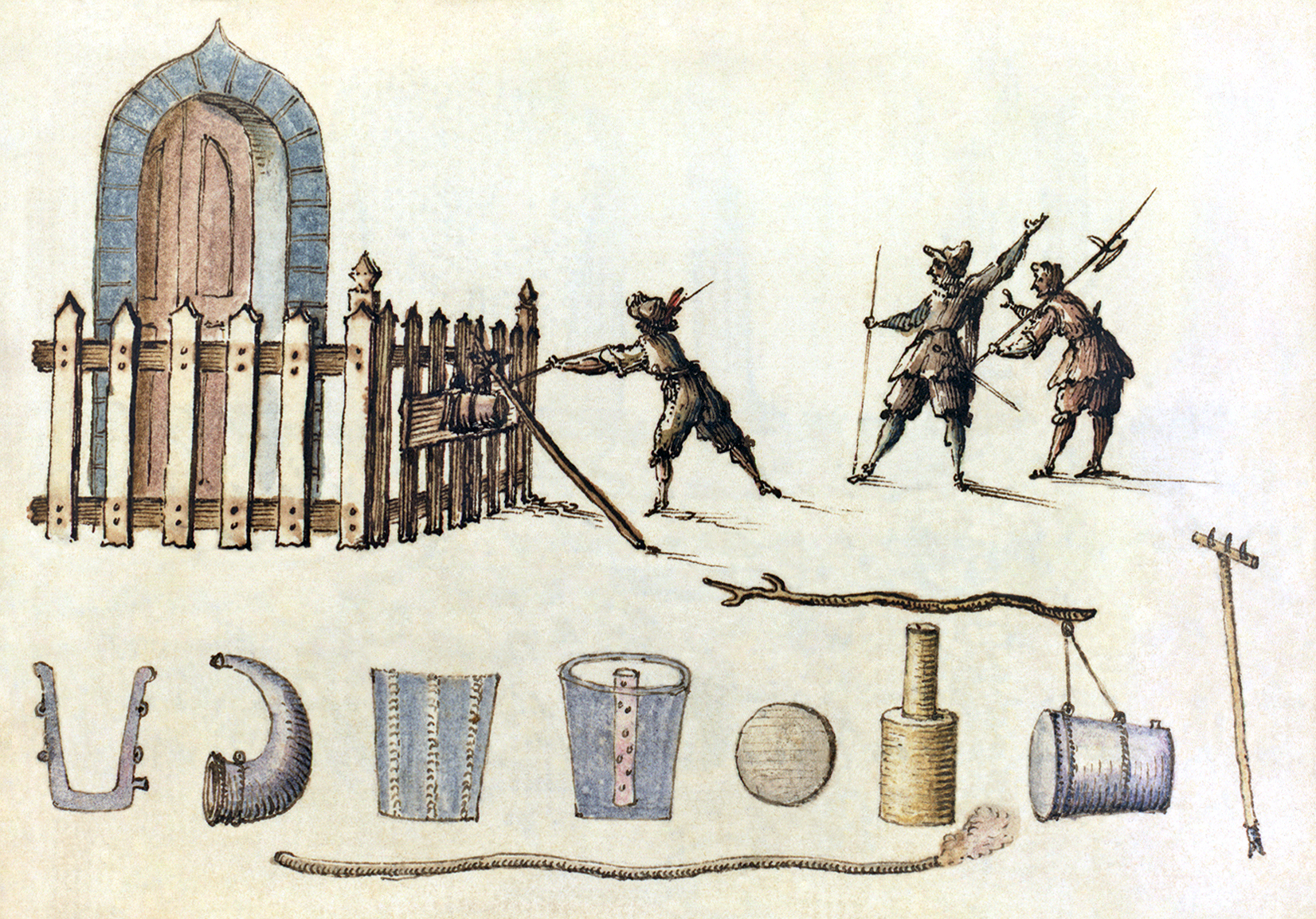
A petard, from a seventeenth-century manuscript of military technology

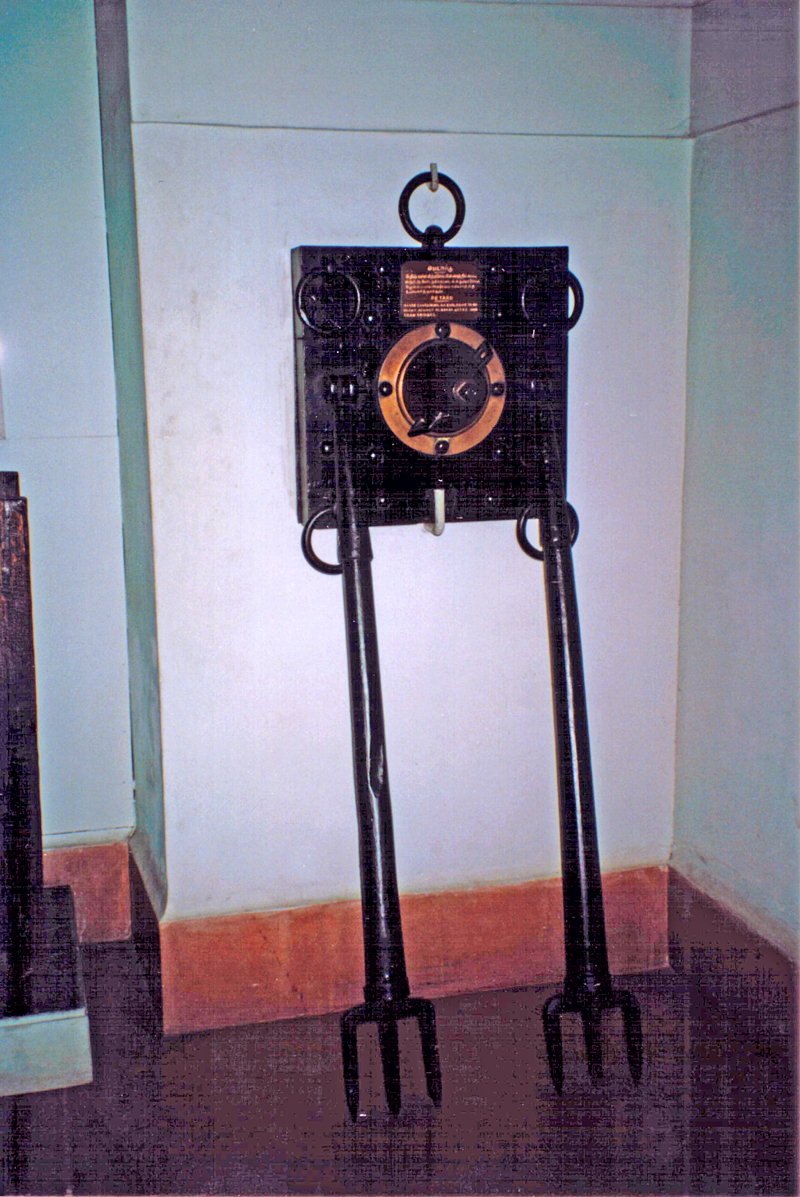
A 19th-century British army petard (in center, projecting from the copper circle), mounted on a madrier, with braces

A petard is a small bomb used for blowing up gates and walls when breaching fortifications, originally invented in France in 1579.

== Etymology ==
Pétard comes from the Middle French péter, to fart, from the root pet, expulsion of intestinal gas, derived from the Latin peditus, past participle of pedere, to break wind.

In modern French, a pétard is a firecracker, and is the basis for words for a firecracker in several other European languages, including English.

Shakespeare's phrase "hoist with his own petard", meaning that one could be lifted (blown) upward by one's own bomb, has become an idiom that means "to be harmed by one's own plan to harm someone else" or "to fall into one's own trap".

== Overview ==
Pétardiers (combat engineers using petards) were deployed during sieges of castles or fortified cities. The pétard was a fairly primitive and exceedingly dangerous explosive device, comprising a brass or iron bell-shaped or rectangular container filled with 2–3 kilograms (4–7 lb) of gunpowder with a slow match for a fuse, and affixed to a wooden or iron base called a madrier. The device was attached to a wall or gate using hooks and rings, the fuse was lit and, if successful, the resulting explosive force, concentrated at the target point, would blow a hole in the obstruction, allowing assault troops to enter.

== Variants ==
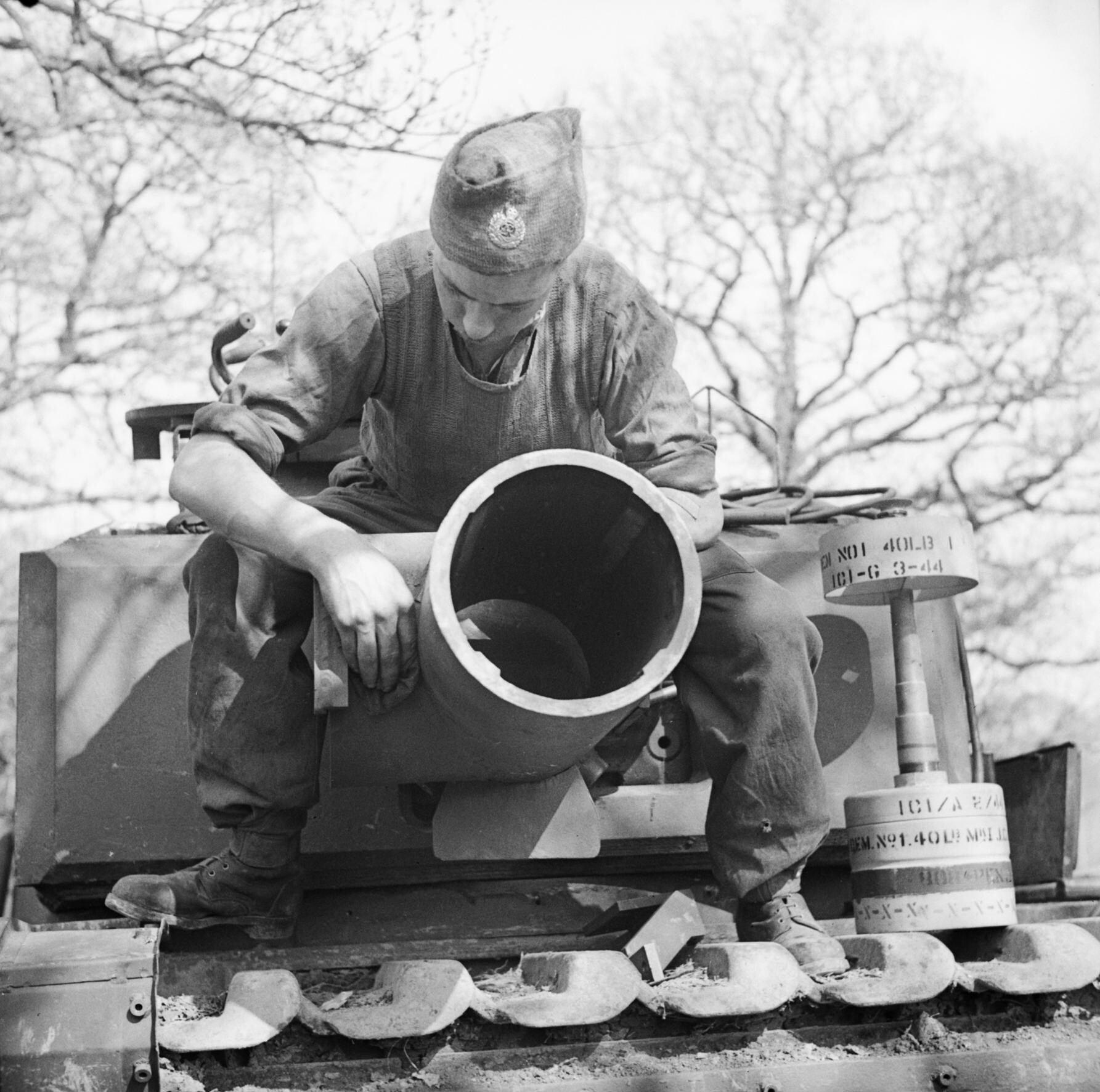
Churchill AVRE with its 230/29 mm spigot mortar and its 228 mm petard bomb ammunition to the right.

In World War II, a petard mortar was a spigot mortar, firing an non-aerodynamic 20 kg (44 lb) charge 228 mm (9.0 in) in diameter, known to its crews as the "flying dustbin" due to the characteristics of its projectile, that could be fired up to 100 m (110 yd). The weapon was mounted on the turret of the Churchill AVRE tank and was sufficient to breach or demolish many bunkers and earthworks.

In Maltese English, home-made fireworks - a popular but highly dangerous hobby in Malta - are called petards (the word in Maltese, murtal, is related to "mortar"). These petards are detonated by the dozen during feasts dedicated to local patron saints. Maltese petards are made by non-technical people without formal education in chemistry, as an exercise in traditional handiwork.

In modern French, pétard is slang for a large marijuana joint or blunt. It is also slang for human buttocks.

== See also ==
- Door breaching – Methods used by military, police, firefighters to forcibly enter a structure
- Fougasse (weapon) – Improvised mortar
- List of inventors killed by their own invention
- Shaped charge – Explosive with focused effect
- Tunnel warfare – Use of tunnels and other underground cavities in wars
