= Penza Bicycle Plant =

Penza Bicycle Plant (Russian: Пензенский велосипедный завод) was a company based in Penza, Russia.

The Penza Frunze Plant Production Association, founded in 1913, was once a major producer of ammunition fuses, and later became known for the production of bicycles. The company went bankrupt in 2016.
