= Friction primer =

Cannon firing device

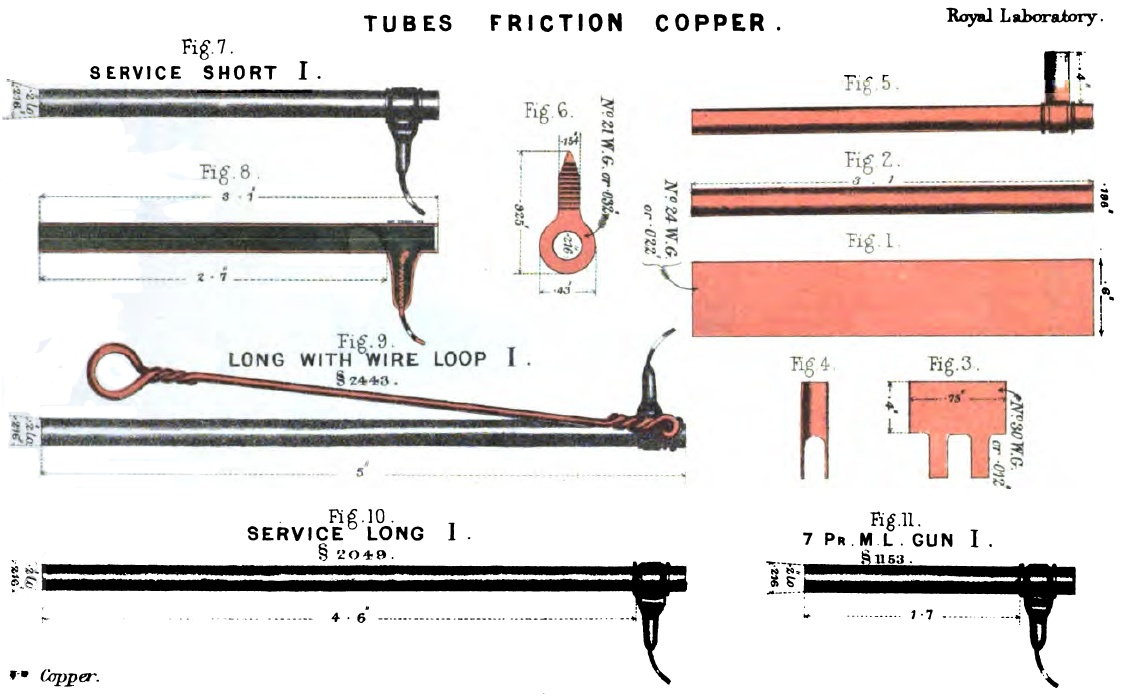
Most of these British friction primers do not have the wire loop attached.

A friction primer is a device to initiate the firing of muzzle-loading cannon. Each friction primer consists of a copper tube filled with gunpowder. The tube fits into the cannon touch hole burying its lower end in the gunpowder chamber. The top end of the tube extending above the touch hole has a short perpendicular spur tube filled with a priming mixture of antimony sulfide and potassium chlorate. A roughened wire slider extends from the outer end of the spur tube through the priming mixture and the gunpowder tube. This slider wire is twisted into a loop on the opposite side of the gunpowder tube.

== Operation ==
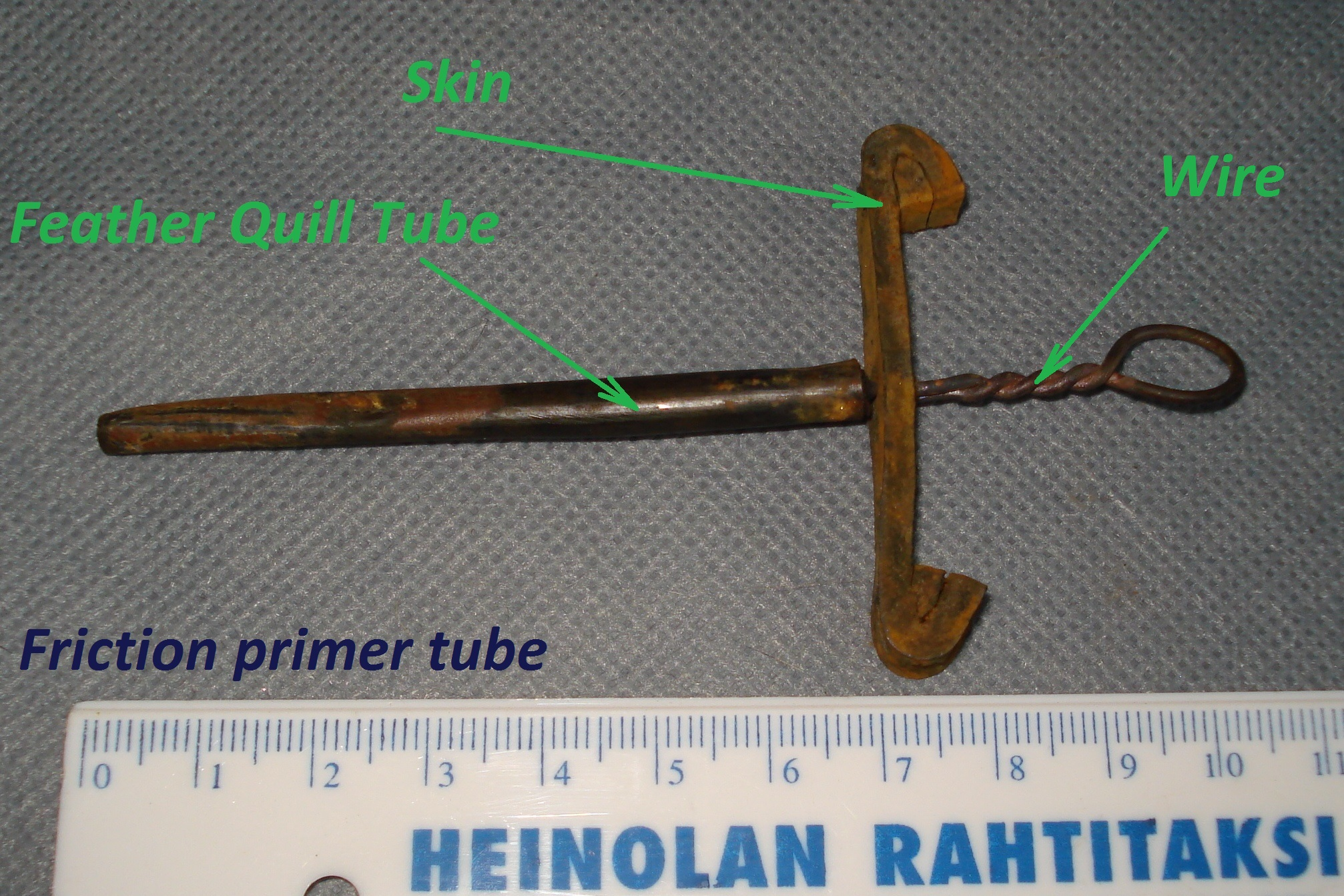
Early friction primer tube photographed in Heinola, Finland in 2015

The wire loop may be attached to a lanyard. A sharp tug on the lanyard pulls the roughened slider wire through the priming mixture which responds like a match, igniting the gunpowder in the tube through the touch hole into the main powder charge within the chamber of the cannon. The length of the lanyard allows the person firing the cannon to avoid injury by standing to one side as the cannon recoils. Friction primers were packed in sawdust in tinned metal boxes for storage and transport.

== See also ==
- Fire piston
