= Fougasse (weapon) =

Improvised mortar

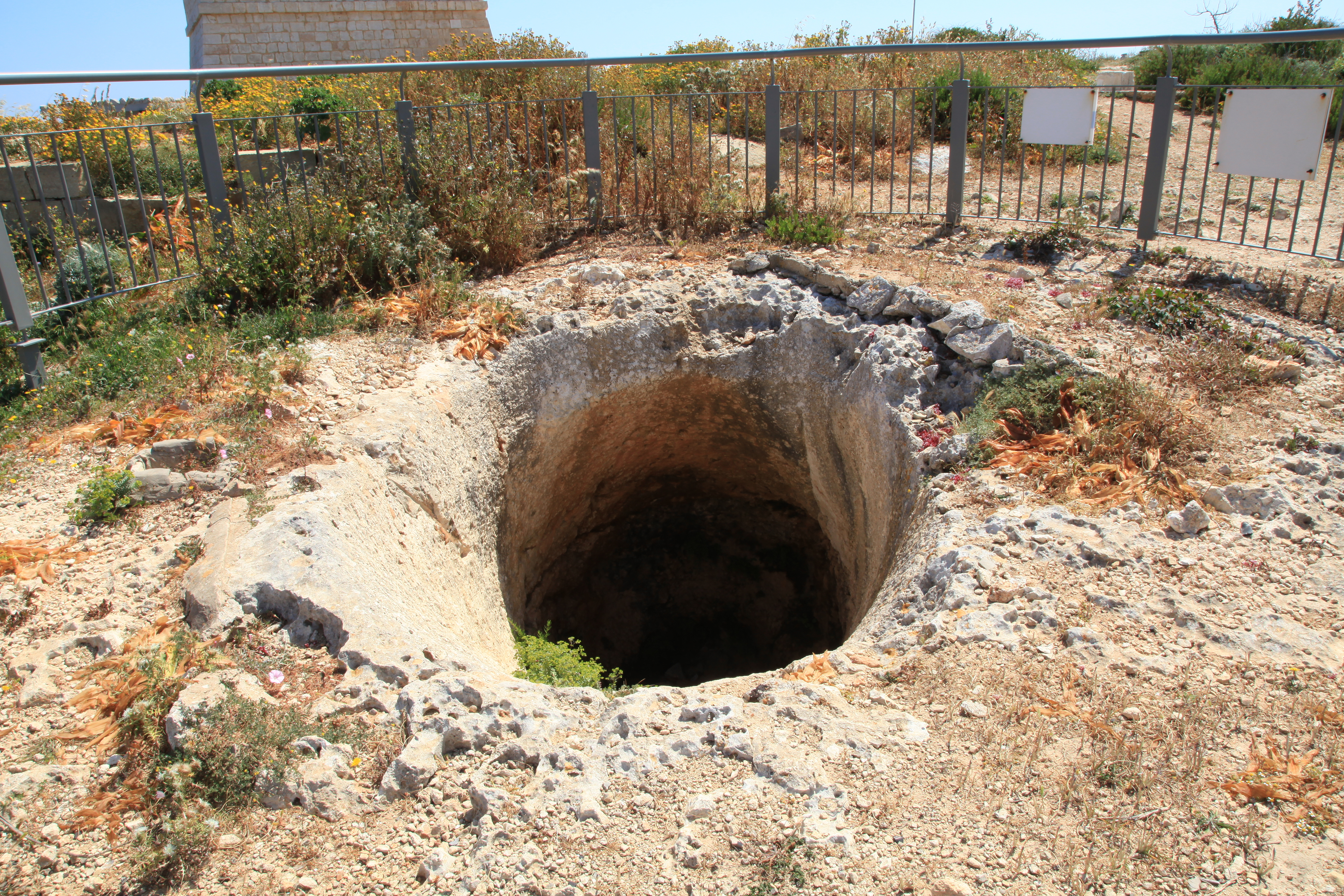
Madliena Fougasse in Malta

A fougasse (UK: /fuːˈɡæs/, US: /fuːˈɡɑːs/, French: [fuɡas], in Italian and Maltese foggazza) is an improvised mortar constructed by making a hollow in the ground or rock and filling it with explosives (originally, black powder) and projectiles. The fougasse was used by Samuel Zimmermann at Augsburg in the sixteenth century, referred to by Vauban in the seventeenth century, and well known to military engineers by the mid-eighteenth century. Notable use of permanent fougasse installations intended for coastal defence were carved into the limestone by the Knights of St. John on Malta. This technique was used in several European wars, the American Revolution, and the American Civil War. The term is still used to describe such devices.

== Firing ==
The normal method of firing was to use a burning torch or slow match to ignite a saucisson (French for "sausage", a cloth or leather tube waterproofed with pitch and filled with black powder) leading to the main charge. This had numerous disadvantages; the firer was obvious to the attacking enemy, and had to run to get clear after lighting the fuse. The black powder was also very susceptible to moisture, and might not work at all. In 1573 Samuel Zimmermann devised an improved method which incorporated a snaphance (or later, flintlock mechanism) into the charge and connected its trigger to the surface with a wire. This was more resistant to moisture, better concealed and enabled the firer to be further away. It also enabled the fougasse to be tripwire activated, turning it into an anti-personnel fragmentation mine.

In a letter to his sister, Colonel Hugh Robert Hibbert described such a weapon employed during the Crimean War:

These wretched Russians have discovered a new system of annoyance which would be well worthy of invention by Franky [their brother] and which consists of a series of small mines or barrels of gunpowder let into the ground between our works and theirs, and a little tin tube running along the ground a few inches above it, two or three feet long, which tube is filled with some composition which explodes immediately on being touched, so that any unfortunate meandering along the grass without knowing why, suddenly finds himself going up in the air like a squib with his legs and arms flying in different directions. We have had many men blown up by these things and the grass being so long one cannot see the tube at all. The technical name is "Fougasse". Franky will know what they are I daresay. The ground between our old trenches, and the Russian ones that we took the other day is full of them. At night you hear a sudden explosion and you know that some wretched fellow has been crossing from one trench to another, on private speculation to see what he could get, has trod on the tube and been blown up. I often think how the Russians must laugh when they hear these things going up at night in all directions, they must know well what it is.

== Types ==
There are several variants according to the material projected by the explosion.

=== Stone ===
Stone fougasse. The top panel of the illustration shows the cross section, the bottom panel shows the top view.

The most common type in early use was the stone fougasse, which was a hole simply filled with large rocks and bricks. When fired, it would scatter a hail of fast-moving stones across the area to its front. Large stone fougasses might hold several tons of rubble and as much as a hundredweight of powder.

=== Shell ===
The shell fougasse was constituted by a box buried and concealed in the ground, divided by a partition into two parts: loaded shells were placed in the upper part, with the fuzes pointed downwards, connected with the lower part by holes bored in the partition, to ensure their ignition; a black powder charge was placed in the lower part, capable, when fired, to throw the shells to the surface. Incendiary carcasses were also used as an alternative load. The fougasse was activated when the enemy was over the spot: the shells were thrown into the air before they exploded, thus increasing the chance for devastation – possibly foreshadowing modern bounding munitions.

=== Flame ===
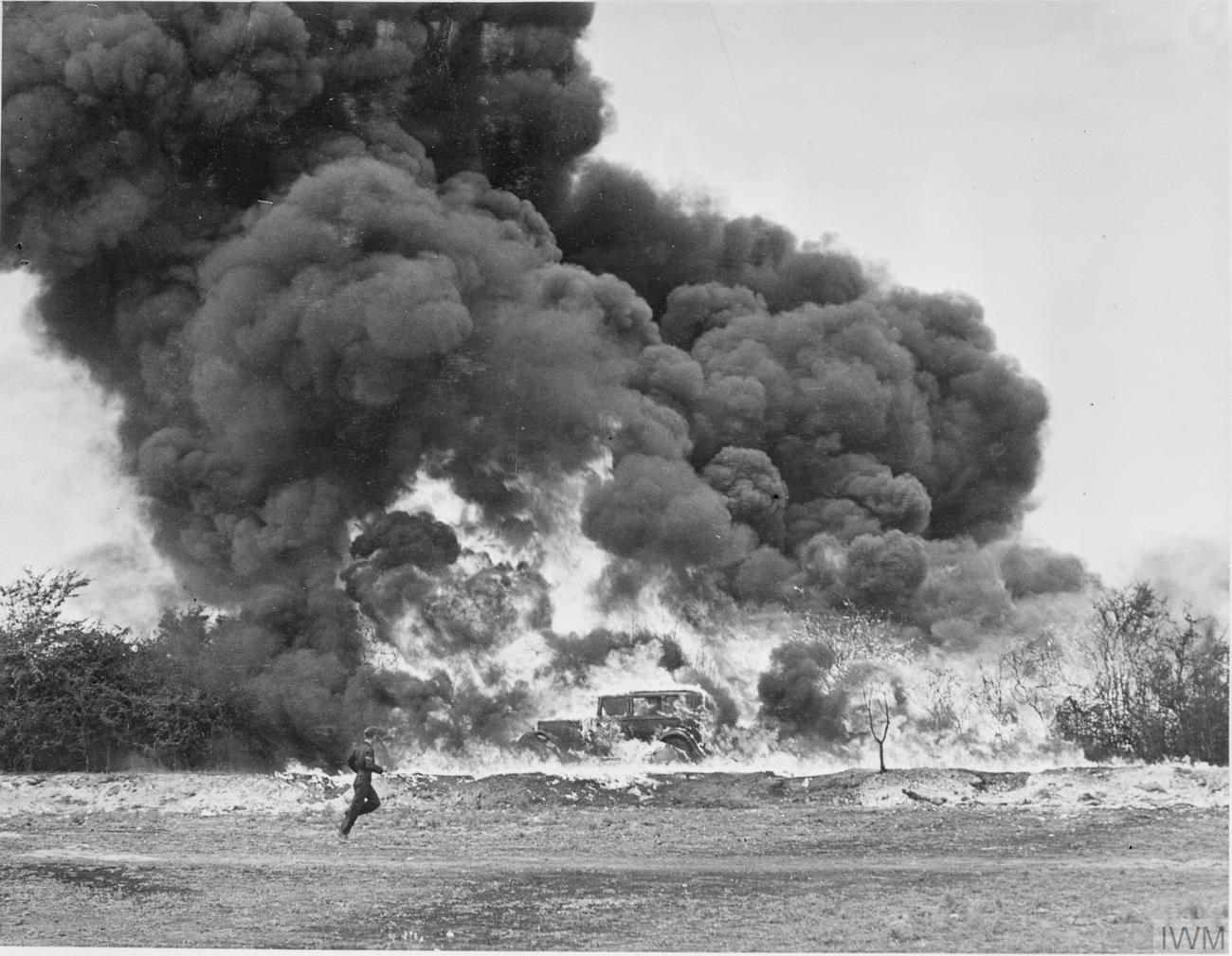
A demonstration of the flame fougasse in Britain; a car is surrounded by flames and a huge cloud of smoke (circa 1940).

A flame fougasse was a similar weapon in which the projectile was a flammable liquid, typically a mixture of petrol and oil. The flame fougasse was developed by the British Petroleum Warfare Department in response to the threat of German invasion during World War II.

In Britain, during WWII, the flame fougasse was usually constructed from a 40-gallon drum dug into the roadside and camouflaged. It would be placed at a location such as a corner, steep incline or roadblock where vehicles would be obliged to slow down. Ammonal provided the propellant charge which, when triggered, caused the weapon to shoot a flame 10 feet (3.0 m) wide and 30 yards (27 m) long. Initially a mixture of 40% petrol and 60% gas oil was used; this was later replaced by an adhesive gel of tar, lime and petrol known as 5B.

The November 1944 issue of the U.S. War Department Intelligence Bulletin refers to 'Fougasse flame throwers' used in the Russian defence at Stalingrad being the basis of a German version found in Italy that were buried with a fixed direction discharge tube and integrated with conventional landmines and barbed wire in defense works. The German weapon, the Abwehrflammenwerfer 42 had an 6.5-imperial-gallon (29.5 L) fuel tank and the seven in the installation were wired back to a control point and could be fired individually or together.

The flame fougasse has remained in army field manuals as a battlefield expedient. Such expedients are constructed from available fuel containers combined with standard explosive charges or hand grenades triggered electrically or by lengths of detonating cord. Some designs use lengths of detonating cord or blasting caps to rupture the fuel container as well as detonate the main charge. Weapons of this sort were widely used in the Korean and Vietnam wars as well as other conflicts.

=== Scrap metal ===
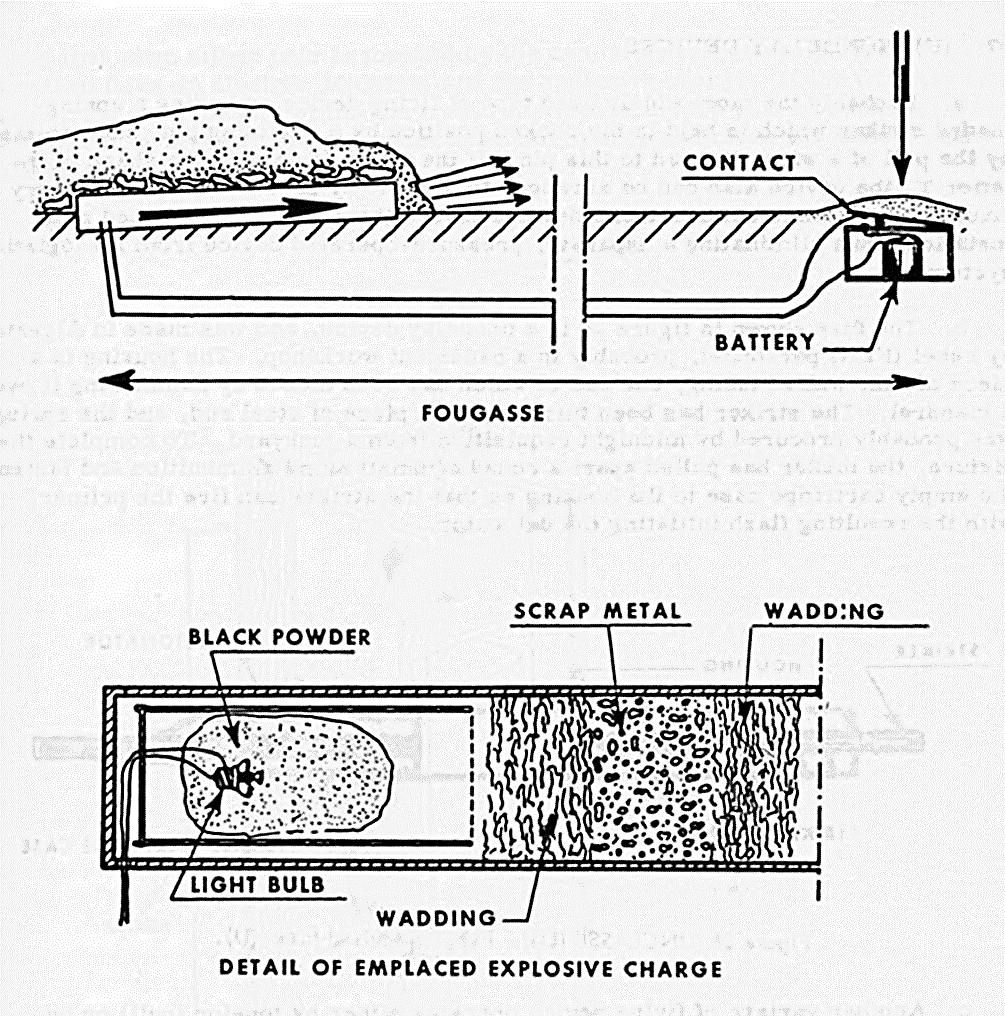
Scrap metal fougasse improvised by the Algerian National Liberation Front. The top panel of the illustration shows the entire installation, including the electric contact which is placed across the road from the exploding part, while the bottom panel shows in detail the structure of the charge portion of the fougasse.

A scrap metal fougasse is designed to launch metallic projectiles – such as steel balls, nuts, nails, bolts, various metal scrap fragments, etc.

This model was used, for instance, by the Algerian National Liberation Front (FLN), which had been fighting for Algeria's independence from France since 1954. The FLN's fougasse was electrically ignited, and consisted of a large metal pipe sealed at one end; at the bottom of it was placed a black powder explosive charge, then covered by a first wadding (such as rags, felt, cardboard, etc.), by a quantity of metallic materials serving as "shrapnel" projectiles, and finally by a second wadding. Embedded in the black powder charge there was an incandescent light bulb – which had the glass bulb broken but the filament intact – connected to an electrical circuit comprising cables, a battery, and an open switch. When the light bulb's filament received an electric current it would glow incandescently, thereby detonating the black powder charge, which projected forward the metal scrap. The switch was operated at the right moment by an FLN member concealed nearby, or it was buried along the anticipated path of enemy troops or thin-skinned vehicles, so that they would accidentally step on it, thereby triggering the fougasse mine.

Similar devices – albeit lighter and smaller in size, making them comparable to improvised Claymore mines or improvised grapeshot charges – also appear in certain U.S. military manuals written for special forces.

== See also ==
- Anti-personnel weapon
- Flame fougasse
- Improvised explosive device
