= American Pyrotechnics Association =

- Company type: Trade association
- Industry: Consumer fireworks
- Founded: 1948
- Headquarters: Southport, North Carolina, US
- Key people: Julie Heckman, Executive Director
- Website: americanpyro.com

The American Pyrotechnics Association (APA) is an American trade association of companies engaged in the consumer fireworks industry.

== History ==
The American Pyrotechnics Association was established by a group of seven fireworks manufacturing companies in 1948 with the aim of addressing industry issues such as safety and compliance with state and local pyrotechnics laws. APA members include many participants in fireworks industry – professional display, consumer & proximate pyrotechnic, manufacturers, importers & distributors, both domestic & foreign.

== Members of the APA ==
Members of the American Pyrotechnics Association include:

American Promotional Events, Arthur Rozzi Pyrotechnics, Lynch Imports LLC, Bellino Fireworks, Fireworks Over America, Galaxy Fireworks, Lidu Fireworks, Pyrotechnico, Rozzi Inc., Shiu Fung Fireworks, Hamburg Fireworks Display Inc., and Walt Disney Entertainment.

== Milton Dropo Award ==
The APA awards the Milton Dropo award, a lifetime achievement award considered to be one of the most prestigious awards in the industry. The award is named for pyrotechnics pioneer Milton Dropo, founder of TNT Fireworks (and brother of baseball player Walt Dropo).

Recipients of the Award include Jim Souza, Bob Souza, Julie Heckman, and Michael Ingram.
