= Black match =

Type of fuse made of cotton

In pyrotechnics, black match is a type of crude fuse, constructed of cotton or polyester string fibers intimately coated with a slurry made of black powder and a binder like dextrin, then dried. It typically burns at a rate of one inch per second, though this rate is dependent on the quality of black powder used.

== Manufacture ==
Black match is typically made by pulling string through a slurry of black powder with 5% binder using a series of rollers, they are then bundled together and pulled through a funnel to scrape off excess slurry and dried. Drying time can take from hours to days, depending on humidity and alcohol content of the slurry mixture

== Quick Match ==
When black match is confined in a paper tube, called quick match or piped match, the flame front propagates at more than a hundred times the speed of unconfined black match, at 10–20 feet per second. This is due to the fire created by the black match getting caught by, and forced down, the paper tube, which in turn ignites more black match, further increasing pressure and burn speed.

Quick match is often used in model rockets in the United Kingdom to ignite multiple engines/motors; it is however largely unavailable in the USA due to ambiguous explosives laws.

== See also ==
- Slow match
- Punk (fireworks)
