= Visco fuse =

Higher quality fuse used for consumer fireworks

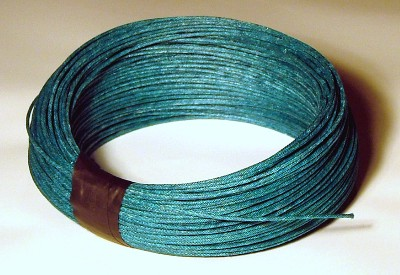
A coil of 100 feet of visco fuse.

A visco fuse is a higher-quality fuse used for consumer fireworks. It is most commonly colored green, red, or pink and is found as a twisted, coated strand. It is also used to create delays in the firing of multiple firework displays for safety.

== Description ==
Visco is a 3/32 - 1/8 inch (2–3 mm)-diameter cord with a black powder core. There are three external layers to visco fuse. First, a layer of string is wound around the core, then a second, less tight, layer of string is wound in the opposite direction to prevent unraveling. The last layer is a low-nitrate nitrocellulose lacquer that keeps the fuse from falling apart. The last layer helps to make the visco fuse water resistant and to prevent moisture from degrading the black powder core. Unlike dynamite safety fuse, visco fuse burns with a visible external flame. After ignition, most visco fuses can burn underwater.

== Variants ==
- Cannon fuse is a visco fuse that is most often thicker, steadier burning, and often extra coated to be more waterproof. Most cannon fuses of high quality can burn while under water. Cannon fuse is normally red or green in color.
- Flying fish fuse is a modified type of visco-type fuse used in fireworks. The composition in the core is a metallic spark composition or another effect instead of/as well as black powder. Flying fish can thus perform as a main effect instead of just an initiator. For example, simply lighting a short piece of flying fish on the ground makes it fly through the air, seeming to swim in random directions while emitting sparks and noise. An aerial shell loaded with many such pieces results in myriad fragments sparking and whizzing high in the air as a substitute for standard pyrotechnic stars.
- Igniter Cord is a commercial grade of visco fuse that is designed to ignite multiple safety fuses. Like visco, igniter cord burns with an external, visible flame. It is often heavily lacquered for water resistance, and sometimes has an inner wire core for mechanical strength.

== See also ==
- Fuse (explosives)
