= Linstock =

Device for holding a slow match in early artillery

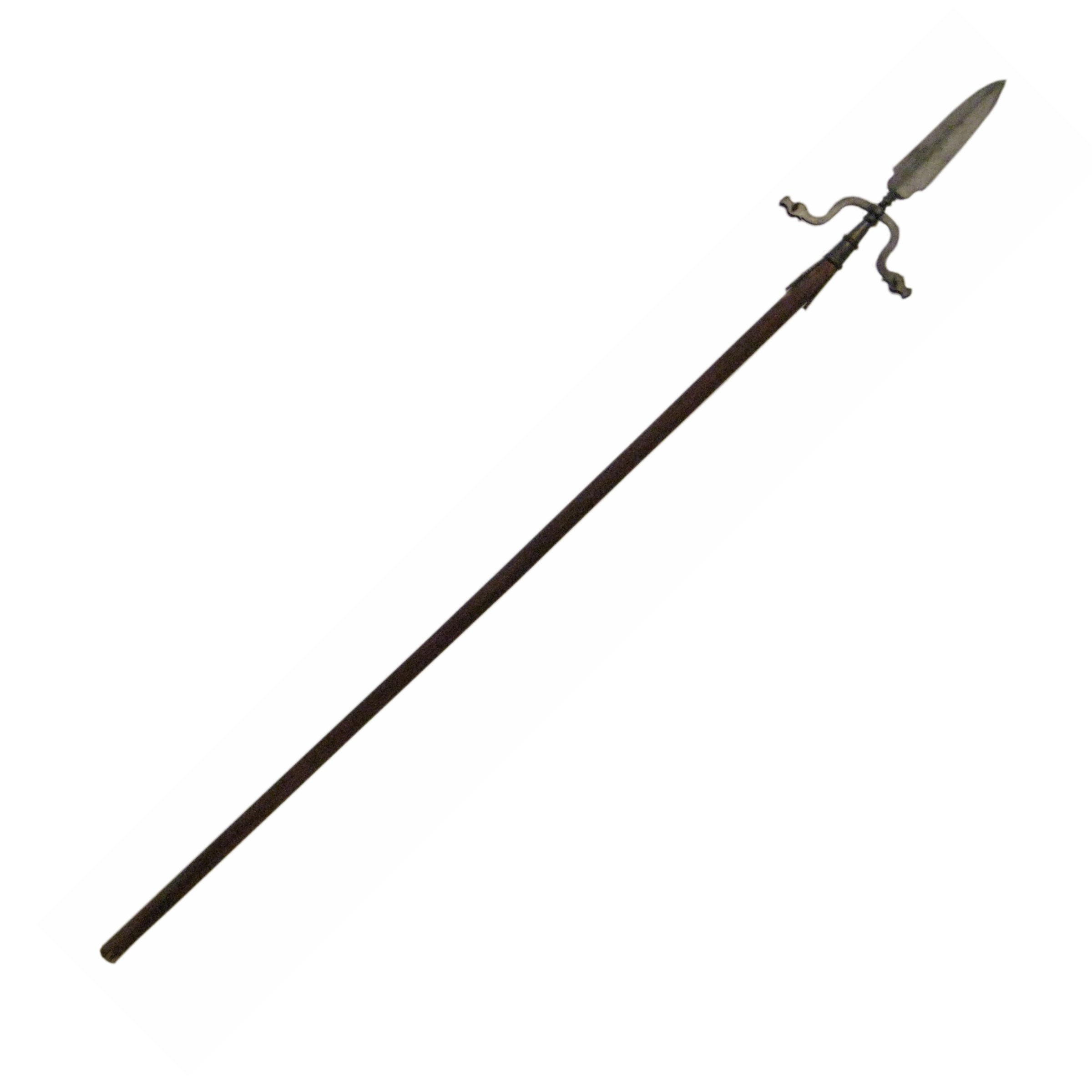
A linstock

Firing of a field gun of the early 17th century with a linstock

A linstock (also called a lintstock) is a staff with a fork at one end to hold a lighted slow match. The name was adapted from the Dutch lontstok, "match stick". Linstocks were used for discharging cannons in the early days of artillery; the linstock allowed the gunner to stand further from the cannon as it was dangerous applying the lighted match to the touch hole at the breech of the gun. Not only could the charge flash back, but the recoil of the cannon might send the carriage toward the gunner.

== Design ==
Linstocks had curving arms called a serpentine that ended with a pinching metal jaw to grip the slow match, and a sharp point at the base to stick in the ground. In emergencies, gunners could use the spear blade as a weapon to defend the cannon.

Like much early modern military equipment, the linstock could have an additional function; 16th century examples had measurements in inches and a protractor engraved on the blade to allow the gun captain to check the angle.

== Obsolescence ==
By the mid-18th century, artillery pieces were being fitted with flintlock firing devices (known as gunlocks), rendering the linstock obsolete though the linstock remained in service in many places where the older form of ignition was used, including the United States during the War of Independence and parts of Europe during the Napoleonic Wars. During the War of 1812 and American Civil War, gun crews were issued linstocks, which were used when the flintlock and percussion cap-ignited primers failed.
