= Touch hole =

Small hole near the rear portion (breech) of a cannon or muzzleloading gun

A diagram of the cannon, including the location of the touch hole

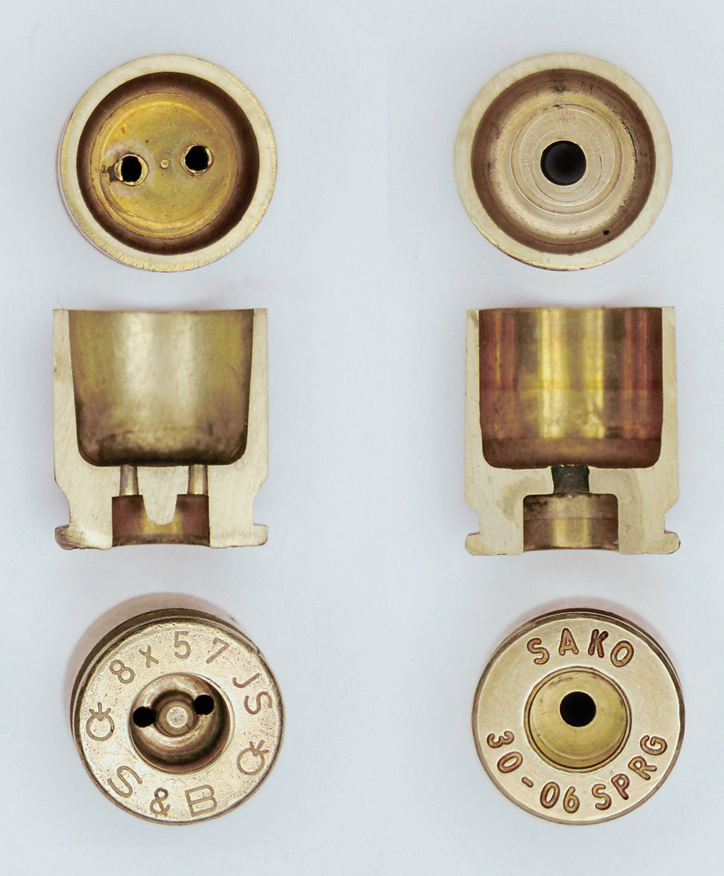
Flash holes through the case head of modern centerfire cartridges, which serve as internal touch holes to transfer ignition sparks from the primer

A touch hole, also known as a cannon vent, is a small hole at the rear (breech) portion of the barrel of a muzzleloading gun or cannon. The hole provides external access of an ignition spark into the breech chamber of the barrel (where the combustion of the propellant occurs), either with a slow match (matchlock), a linstock or a flash pan ignited by some type of pyrite- (wheellock) or flint-based gunlock (snaplock, snaphaunce, and flintlock), which will initiate the combustion of the main gunpowder charge. Without a touch hole, it would be nearly impossible to ignite the powder because the only otherwise access into the barrel is from the front via the muzzle, which is obturated by the projectile.

In the later caplock firearms, the ignition sparks are generated by a shock-sensitive percussion cap placed over a conical "nipple", which has a hollow conduit that leads into the barrel's back chamber known as the flash channel. When shooting, the percussion cap is struck by a spring-cocked hammer, causing the fulminates inside to generate primary sparks, and the flash channel serves the same function as the touch hole to transfer the sparks from the percussion cap into the barrel to ignite the propellant.

In modern breechloading firearms, the propellant charge is packaged inside a cartridge, and ignition is generated by a modified percussion cap (known as a primer) seated inside a cavity at the back end ("head") of the cartridge case, which is struck by a firing pin during shooting. Between the primer pocket and case chamber are one or more apertures known as the flash holes, which serve functionally as a touch hole inside the cartridge to transfer the ignition sparks.

In artillery, priming powder, a fuse, squib, or friction igniter is inserted into the touch hole to ensure ignition of the charge. The ignition might be achieved via striking or electrically.

== Spiking the guns ==
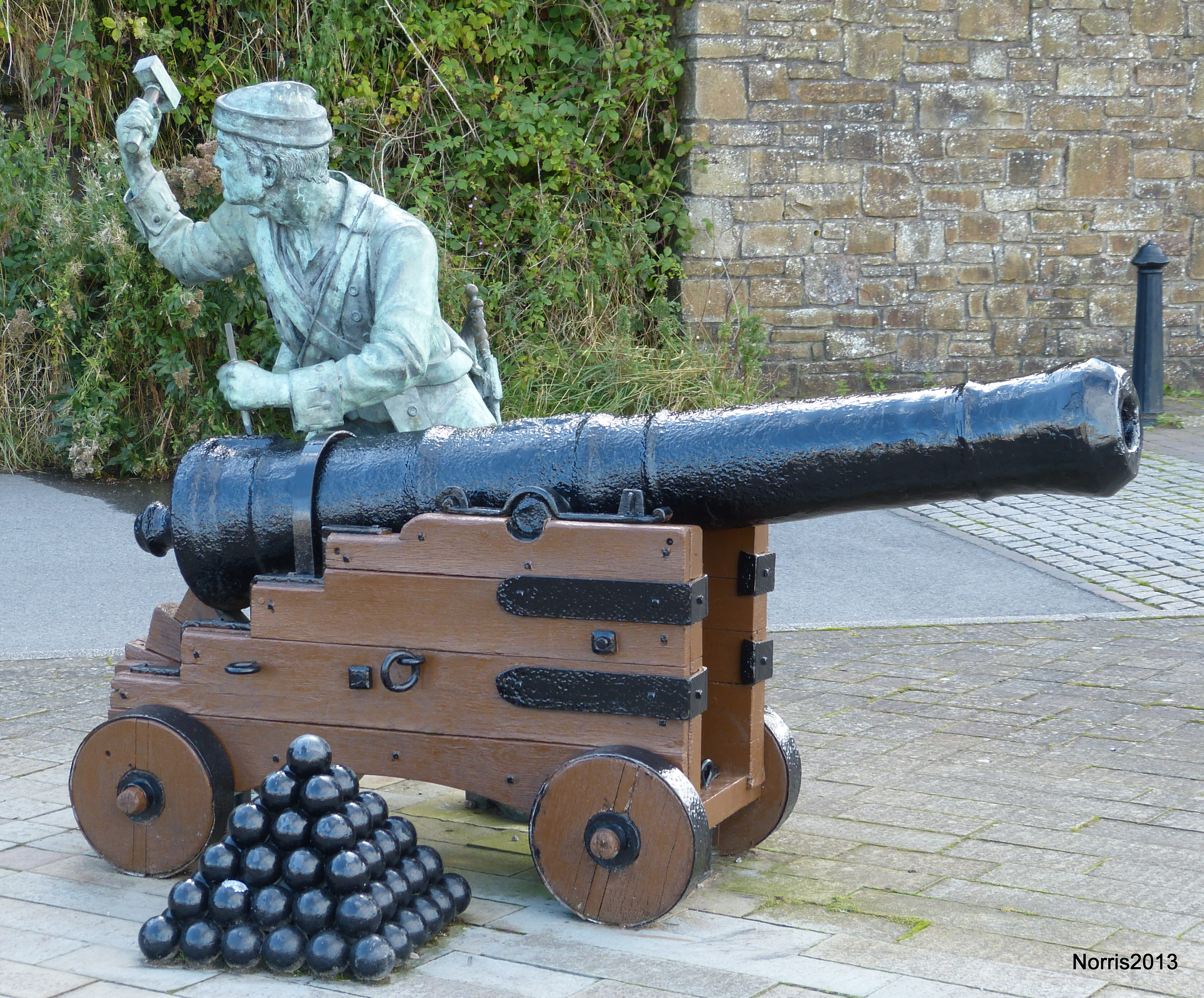
A sculpture in Whitehaven depicting an American sailor in the act of spiking a cannon

Spiking a gun was a method of temporarily disabling a cannon by hammering a barbed steel spike into the touch hole; this could be removed only with great difficulty. If a special spike was unavailable, spiking could be done by driving a bayonet into the touch-hole and breaking it off, to leave the blade's tip embedded. Guns could also be rendered useless by burning their wooden carriages or blowing off their trunnions.

Count Friedrich Wilhelm von Bismarck, in his Lectures on the Tactics of Cavalry, recommended that every cavalry soldier carry the equipment needed to spike guns if an encounter with enemy artillery was expected. If a cannon were in danger of being captured by the enemy, its crew would spike the gun to prevent it from being used against them. Captured guns would be spiked if they could not be hauled away and the gun's recapture seemed unlikely.
