= Fuse (explosives) =

Device that initiates sudden release of heat and gas

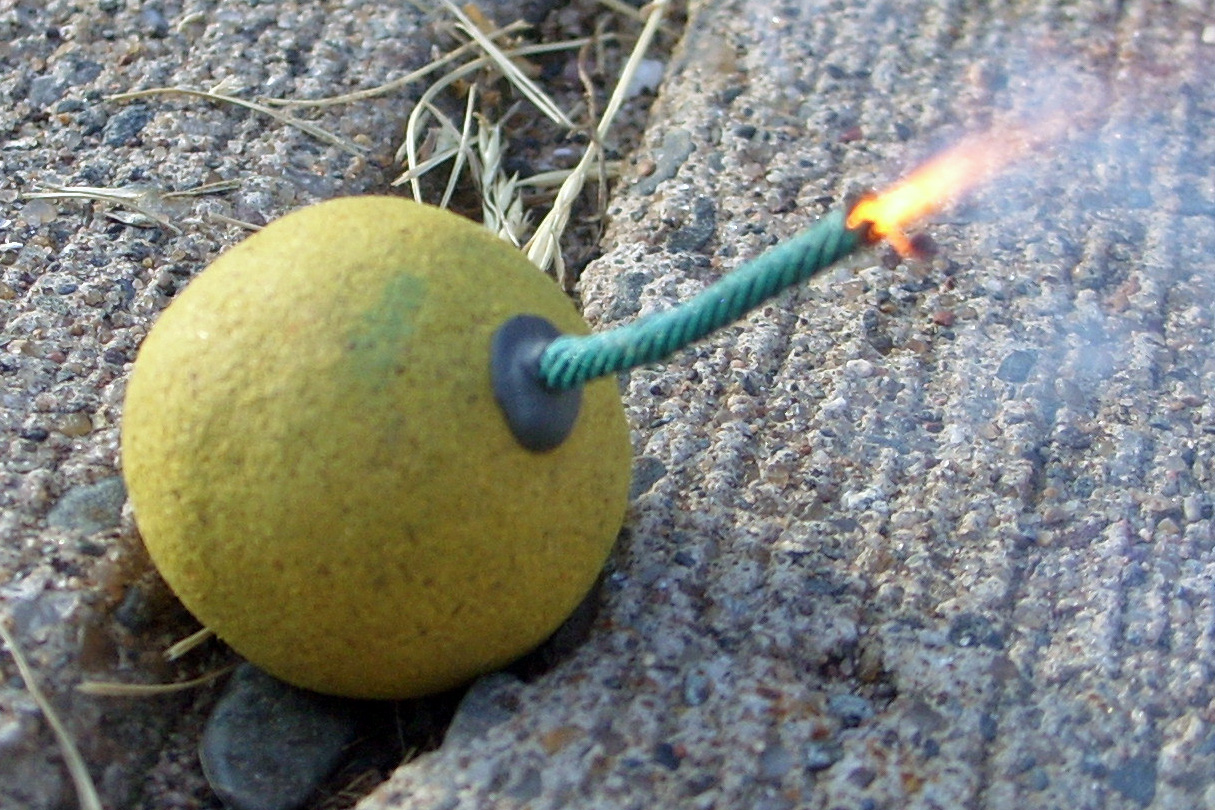
A smoke bomb with a lit fuse

In an explosive, pyrotechnic device, or military munition, a fuse (or fuze) is the part of the device that initiates function. In common usage, the word fuse is used indiscriminately. However, when being specific (and in particular in a military context), the term fuse describes a simple pyrotechnic initiating device, like the cord on a firecracker, whereas the term fuze is used when referring to a more sophisticated ignition device incorporating mechanical and/or electronic components, such as a proximity fuze for an M107 artillery shell, a magnetic or acoustic fuze on a sea mine, a spring-loaded grenade fuze, a pencil detonator, or an anti-handling device.

Despite this technical distinction, both spellings are also used for either sense. In particular, fuze is treated as a variant spelling of fuse for the simple cord-type device, especially in American English.

== History ==
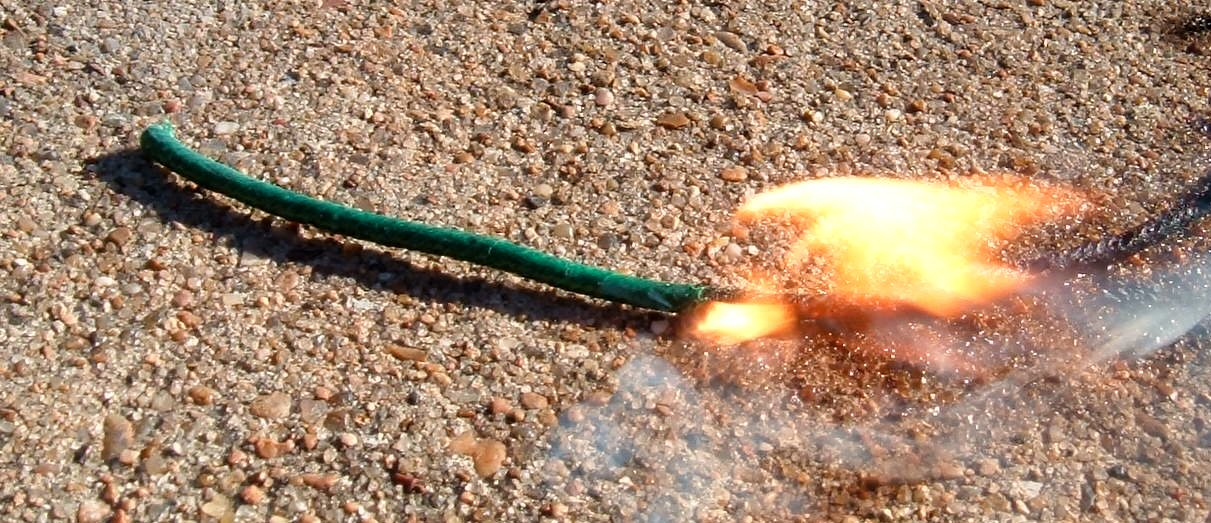
A burning length of fuse

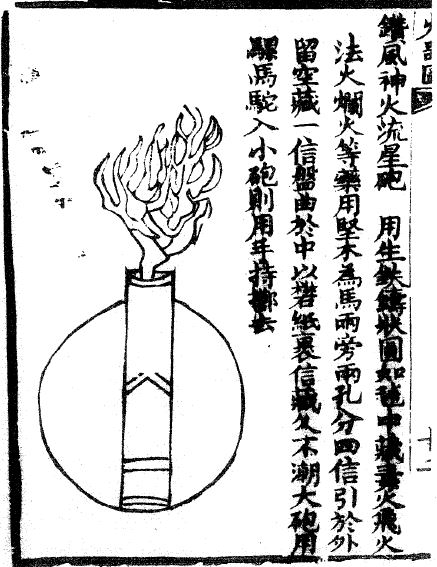
A gunpowder bomb made with cast iron shell and fitted with a fuse, as illustrated in the Huolongjing.

Documented evidence suggests that the earliest fuses were first used by the Song Chinese between the 10th and 12th centuries. After the Chinese invented gunpowder, they began adapting its explosive properties for use in military technology. By 1044 they began utilising gunpowder in simple grenades, bombs, and flamethrowers fitted with fuses such as the Thunder-crash bomb.

The simplest form of fuse is the burning fuse, believed to date back to the 10th century and originating during the Chinese Song dynasty. This simple fuse consisted of lightweight paper filled with loose gunpowder, and served as a means of delaying ignition in fireworks. This simple form of burning fuse can still be found today in many modern fireworks. A version of this simple fuse is called visco fuse, and consists of the burning core coated with wax or lacquer for durability and water resistance. Early fuses for grenades also consist of a wooden plug with a longitudinal hole filled with a slow burning gunpowder mixture inserted into the grenade. Such fuses were in use until the 18th century. The commercial and military version of a burning fuse referred to as safety fuse (invented by William Bickford) is a textile tube filled with combustible material and wrapped to prevent external exposure of the burning core. Safety fuses are used to initiate the detonation of explosives through the use of a blasting cap.

=== Fuses ===
Modern day safety fuses are often used in mining and military operations, to provide a time-delay before ignition, and they more often than not are used to initiate an explosive detonator, thereby starting an explosive chain reaction to detonate a larger more stable main charge. Safety fuses are typically colored green or black (military) or fluorescent orange (commercial) to distinguish them from detonating cords such as Primacord, which are brightly colored or transparent.

=== Usage ===
Fuses are found in pyrotechnics, model cannons, matchlock firearms, some improvised explosive devices, and many forms of fireworks.

== Types ==
- A slow match is a very slow-burning fuse consisting of a hemp or cotton rope saturated with an oxidizer such as potassium nitrate. Slow matches are used as a source of fire for manually lighting other devices, such as matchlock guns, or fuses on black powder cannons. Before percussion caps, slow matches were most suitable for use around black-powder weapons because it could be roughly handled without going out, and only presented a small glowing tip instead of a large flame that risked igniting powder supplies nearby.
- Today's punks (wood splints covered with ground plant pith or dung and then saturated with nitrate) used for lighting consumer fireworks are a type of slow match.
- A black match is a type of fuse consisting of cotton string coated with a dried slurry of black powder and glue. This acts as a simple pass-fire, and was used to fire ancient cannons. They are used today in fireworks construction.
- A quick match or piped match is a type of black powder fuse that burns very quickly, some hundreds of feet per second. They consist of black match covered with a loose paper wrap (pipe). When lit, the flame propagates quickly down the paper pipe from the hot gases produced by the burning powder. Quick matches are used in professional fireworks displays to pass fire nearly instantly between devices that must be physically separated while firing simultaneously, such as a finale rack. Devices which should fire in sequence can be branched from a single master fuse, consisting of quick match spliced onto Visco fuses of various length for time delays.
- A visco fuse has a core of black powder with one or more textile overwraps. The outer layers may be coated with wax or nitrocellulose lacquer for water resistance. These fuses are widely used in modern pyrotechnics because they burn at a uniform rate, with an easily visible external flame. Depending on their outer treatment, visco fuses are water resistant and the better quality can burn reliably underwater once lit, since the black powder core provides both its own fuel and oxidant.
- A safety fuse consists of a black powder core in a textile tube, covered with asphaltum or other waterproofing agent, and having an outer wrapper of tough textile or plastic. They are made in a standard diameter designed to be crimped into blasting caps. Once ignited, safety fuses will burn underwater, and have no external flame that might ignite methane or other fuels such as might be found in mines or other industrial environments. Safety fuses are manufactured with specified burn times per 30 cm, e.g. 60 seconds, which means that a length of fuse 30 cm long will take 60 seconds to burn. Manufacturers warn that although every effort is made to ensure uniform burn times, safety fuses are subject to variation depending on conditions and should be used with adequate safety measures in place.
- An electric match (sometimes Igniter Safety Fuse Electric (ISFE)) lights a main fuse or device when activated by an electric current. They typically consist of a pair of wires leading to a thin resistance wire that heats when current is applied. The resistance wire is covered by a bit of pyrotechnic composition that ignites from the wire heating, providing enough fire to reliably ignite the main fuse via a mechanical connection, or the device directly. Estes model rocket motors are lit by a type of electric match. Large fireworks displays are launched with complex timing sequences using a computer that energizes electric matches connected to the individual device fuses.
- A flying fish fuse (bumblebee) is an unusual type of component for fireworks. It is made like Visco fuse, but contains a metallic spark composition or other effect instead of black powder. Flying fish can thus perform as a main effect instead of just an initiator. For example, simply lighting a short piece of flying fish on the ground makes it fly through the air, seeming to swim in random directions, while emitting sparks and noise. An aerial shell loaded with many such pieces results in a myriad of pieces flying and sparking high in the air.
- A spolette is a delay fuse consisting of a hollow wooden dowel or a paper tube rammed full of black powder. A spolette is glued into the wall of a fireworks shell and ignited by the lift charge that launches the shell into the air. The spolette, after a delay that allows the shell to reach its top of trajectory, ignites the shell's main effect(s). The tough wood construction ensures that the fuse burns reliably despite the explosive force and acceleration of the launch.
- The saucisson was an early form of fuse.

== See also ==
- Anti-handling device
- Artillery fuze
- Black match
- Candle wick
- Contact fuze
- Detcord
- Percussion cap
- Proximity fuze
- Punk (fireworks)
- Safety fuse
- Slow match
- Thermalite
- Time bomb
- Improvised explosive device
- TM 31-210 Improvised Munitions Handbook
