= Punk (fireworks) =

Smoldering stick

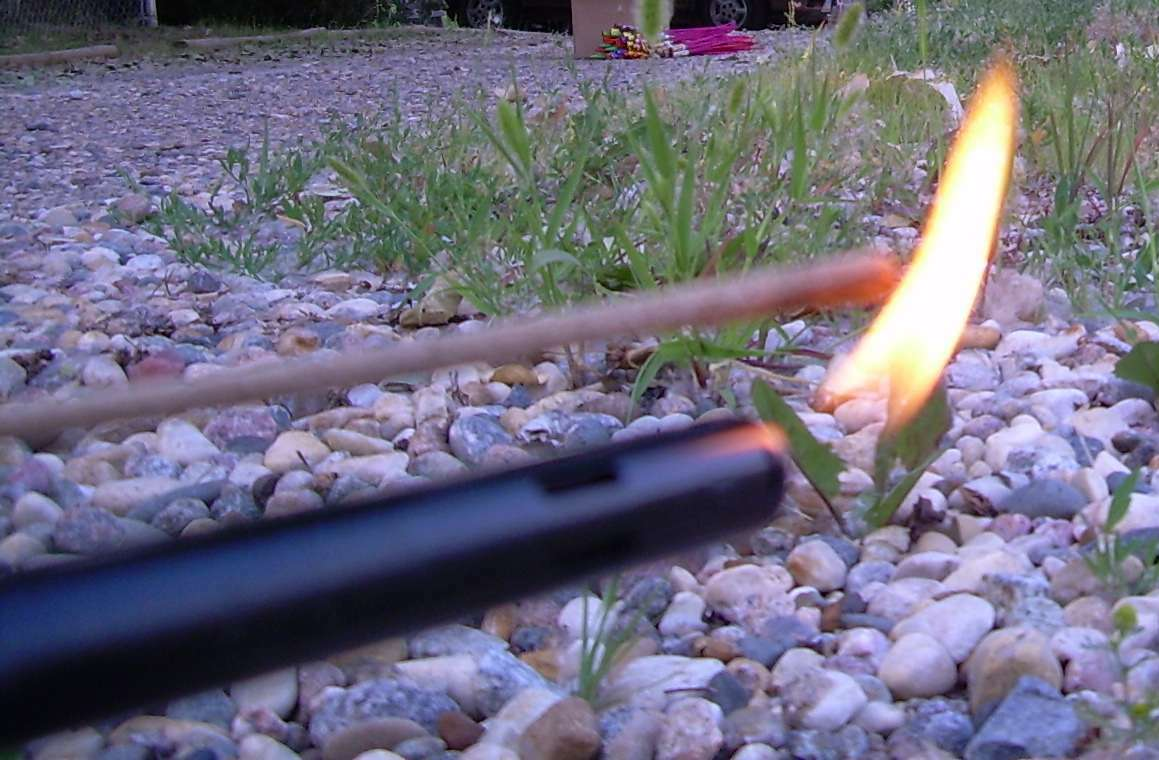
A lighter is shown with the flame at the tip of the punk

A punk is a smoldering stick used for lighting firework fuses. It is safer than a match or a lighter because it can be used from a greater distance and does not use an open flame. They are made of bamboo and a brown coating of compressed sawdust. Punks often resemble sticks of incense, and in some countries actual incense sticks are used in a similar fashion. Punks are sold at nearly all firework stands and many stands will include them for free with a purchase.

The term is unrelated to punk in the musical, criminal or sexual sense; it instead originally referred to materials used as tinder to light fires, derived from either the Unami punkw ('dust', 'ashes', 'powder') or English spunk, which originally meant "spark."

== See also ==
- Black match
- Slow match
- Pyrotechnics
- Tinder
