= Slow match =

Slow-burning cord or twine fuse

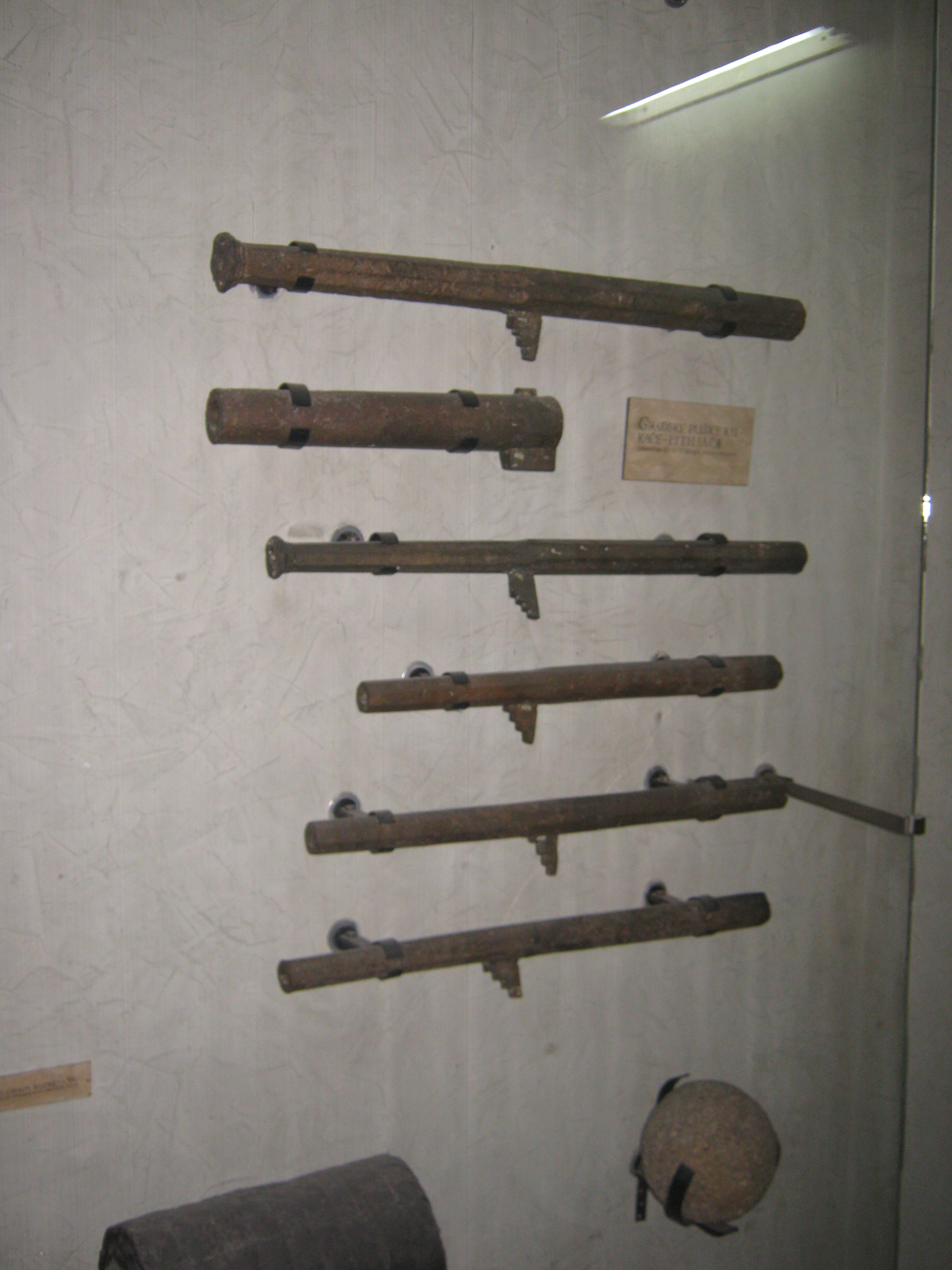
Musket "Fitiljača" (named after the slow match used to ignite the gunpowder) used by the Serbian Army in the 15th century.

Slow match, also called match cord, is the slow-burning cord or twine fuse used by early gunpowder musketeers, artillerymen, and soldiers to ignite matchlock muskets, cannons, shells, and petards. Slow matches were most suitable for use around black-powder weapons because a slow match could be roughly handled without going out, and only presented a small glowing tip instead of a large flame that risked igniting nearby gunpowder. Slow match of various types was one of the first kinds of artillery fuse.

Slow matches were also used in the drilling and blasting of rock to ignite charges of gunpowder.

== Design and use ==
The slow match attached to the lock of the matchlock gun was usually a length of hemp or flax cord that had been chemically treated to make it burn slowly and consistently for an extended period. In Japan, however, match cord was made from braiding together strands of bark from the Japanese cypress. The rate of burning was approximately 1 ft (305 mm) per hour. The British Army estimated that a single soldier on guard duty, for one year, could use an entire mile's worth of match cord. In practical use on a matchlock, both ends of the match cord were often ignited, as the flash of gunpowder in the flash pan could extinguish one end of the match cord, and the remaining end could then be used to reignite the firing end of the cord upon reloading the matchlock musket. To prevent dragging the match cord on wet ground, a linstock, a forked wooden support inserted into the ground and used for holding the end of the match cord furthest removed from the matchlock, was typically carried.

Many formulas for match cord exist, providing varying burn rates. The predominant chemical used was potassium nitrate, although sodium nitrate, and lead(II) acetate also appear to have been used. Potassium nitrate had an advantage over sodium nitrate, being less likely to absorb atmospheric moisture.

Match cord was often used from the 15th century until about 1630, when the flintlock started its rise to prominence. (The arrival of the snaplock after 1540 had only limited impact on match cord use, snaplocks generally being considered a peasant's weapon.) Match cord remained in use with limited numbers of matchlocks in Europe until approximately 1730, and in Japan until the early 1900s. Even once it became obsolete for small arms use, some artillery users (notably the Royal Navy) continued to deploy it as a backup until the end of the flintlock era.

Historic England published a well illustrated account of the investigation of conservation work on a slow match pouch found in the intertidal zone at Medmerry, West Sussex, now in the collection of the National Museum of the Royal Navy.

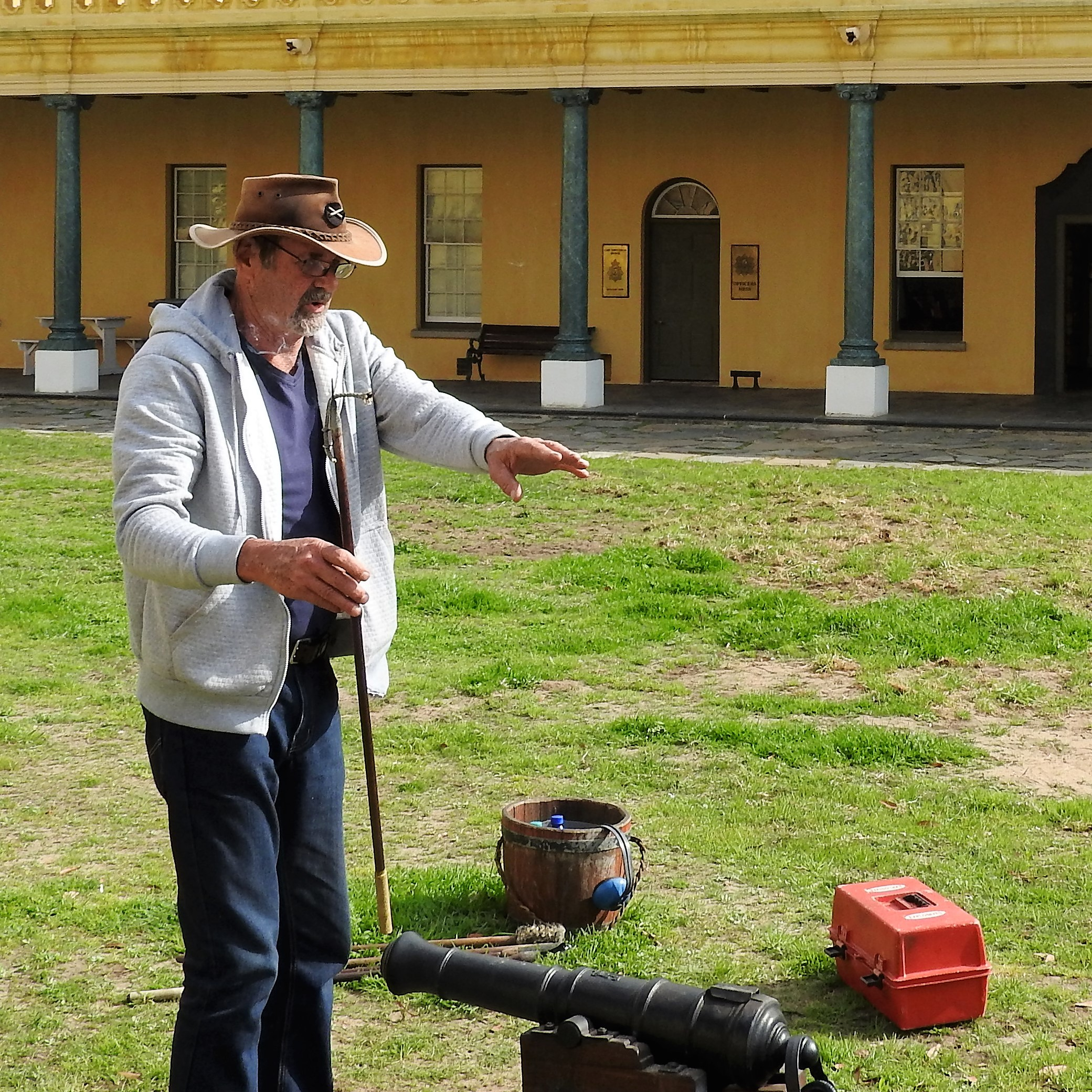
Artillery demonstrator with burning slow match

== Modern use and replacements ==
Modern-day slow match (used with replica matchlock firearms) is sometimes made of cotton cord, instead of hemp, due to legalities associated with growing hemp plants.

For faster burning and modern-day applications such as for igniting fireworks, either tubed black match (sometimes termed quick match) or punk are generally used instead of slow match.

== See also ==
- Black match
- Hand cannon
- Flash pan
- Fuse (explosives)
- Matchlock
- Linstock
- Punk (fireworks)
- Touch hole
