= Beckett =

Beckett is an English surname. Notable people with the surname include:

- Adam Beckett (1950–79), American animator, special effects artist and teacher, worked on Star Wars
- Alex Beckett (footballer) (born 1954), Scottish footballer
- Alex Beckett (actor) (1982–2018), British actor
- Allan Beckett (1914–2005), British civil engineer
- Andy Beckett (born 1969), British journalist and historian
- Ann Beckett (1927–2002), Irish pioneer of occupational therapy
- Arnold Beckett (1920–2010), British pharmacist, academic, and expert on doping in sport
- Barry Beckett (1943–2009), American musician
- Beatrice Beckett (1905–1957), the first wife of the British statesman Anthony Eden
- Bernard Beckett (born 1967), New Zealand writer of fiction for young adults
- Billy Beckett (1915–1998), English footballer
- Bob Beckett (1936–2019), former Canadian ice hockey centre
- Charles Beckett (cricketer) (1794–1838), English first-class cricketer
- Charles Beckett (politician) (born 1958), American politician
- Charles Edward Beckett (1849–1925), brigadier-general and cavalry officer in the British Army
- Chris Beckett (born 1955), English writer, social worker and academic
- Christopher Beckett, 4th Baron Grimthorpe (1915–2003)
- Claire Beckett (born 1978), American photographer
- Clarice Beckett (1887–1935), Australian Tonalist painter
- Clifford Thomason Beckett (1891–1972) British Major General
- Damian Beckett or Cham (born 1979), Jamaica born rapper, singer-songwriter and actor
- Dave Beckett (born 1949), of Canadian pop duo Gary and Dave
- David Beckett (born 1954), English cricketer
- Derry Beckett (1919–1959), Irish Gaelic footballer and hurler
- Douglas Beckett (born 1959), former English cricketer
- Edmund Beckett, 1st Baron Grimthorpe (1816–1905)
- Sir Edmund Beckett, 4th Baronet (1787–1874)
- Edward Beckett, 5th Baron Grimthorpe (born 1954)
- Edwin Beckett (1937–2018), Head of the British Defence Staff in Washington, D.C.
- Emma Beckett (born 1984), Australian netball player in the ANZ Championship
- Emma Beckett (born 1987), Irish footballer
- Ernest Beckett, 2nd Baron Grimthorpe (1856–1917)
- Ernest Beckett (1869–1952), footballer
- Francis Beckett (born 1945), English author, journalist, biographer, and contemporary historian
- Fred Beckett (1917–1946), American jazz trombonist
- Galen Beckett or Mark Anthony (writer), American author who lives and writes in Colorado
- Gervase Beckett (1866–1937), born William Gervase Beckett-Denison, British banker and Conservative politician
- Gwladys Beckett or Gwladys, Lady Delamere (1897–1943), the first female Mayor of Nairobi from 1938 to 1940
- Harry Beckett (1935–2010), British trumpeter and flugelhorn player of Barbadian origin
- Harry Beckett (actor) (1839–1880), comedian who was president of the Lambs from 1879 to 1880
- Hollis Beckett (1896–1976), politician in Ontario, Canada
- Isaac Beckett (1653–1719), English mezzotint engraver, one of the first practitioners of the art in the country
- J. C. Beckett (1912–1996), Northern Irish historian
- James Beckett (disambiguation)
- Jason Beckett (born 1980), Canadian professional ice hockey defenceman
- Jerry Beckett (1886–1943), Irish Gaelic footballer
- Joe Beckett (1892–1965), English boxer
- Joe Rand Beckett (1891–1969), American veteran of World War I, lawyer, member of the Indiana Senate
- Joel Beckett (born Joel Bygraves), English actor
- John Beckett (disambiguation)
- Josh Beckett (born 1980), Major League Baseball pitcher
- Julia Beckett (born 1986), English competitive swimmer
- Justin Beckett, American entrepreneur, philanthropist and author
- Kelly Beckett, English professional host, actress, musician and model
- Kirsten Beckett (born 1996), South African artistic gymnast
- Larry Beckett (born 1947), American poet and songwriter best known for his collaborations with Tim Buckley in the late 1960s
- Laurel Beckett, American biostatistician
- Lenny Beckett (born 1980), Australian rugby union player
- Lez Beckett, Australian hip hop artist
- Liam Beckett (born 1951), football manager and former player from Northern Ireland
- Luke Beckett (born 1976), English former professional footballer
- Margaret Beckett (born 1943), British Labour Party politician and Member of Parliament
- Marion H. Beckett (1886–1949), American painter
- Mary Beckett (1926–2013), Irish author
- Matt Beckett (born 1973), Welsh former professional cyclist
- Mavis Beckett, former Australian field hockey player
- Michael Beckett (born 1995), British Olympic sailor
- Miles Beckett, co-founder of EQAL, media and technology company in 2008
- Nicholas Beckett (born 1987), Jamaican international footballer
- Peter Beckett (born 1948), English musician and songwriter
- Ralph Beckett, 3rd Baron Grimthorpe (1891–1963)
- Ray Beckett (journalist) (1903–1983), Australian journalist, newspaper editor and author
- Ray Beckett (sound engineer), British sound engineer
- Richard B. Beckett (1919–1983), Canadian politician
- Richard Beckett (author) (1936–1987), Australian author and journalist
- Richard Beckett (cricketer) (1772–1809), English amateur cricketer and captain
- Rick Beckett (1954–2009), American radio broadcaster
- Rob Beckett (born 1986), English stand-up comedian and presenter
- Robbie Beckett (born 1972), former Major League Baseball pitcher
- Robbie Beckett (rugby league) (born 1974), former professional rugby league footballer
- Robert Beckett (1862–1917), English-born Australian politician
- Rogers Beckett (born 1977), American former football safety
- Ronald G. Beckett (born 1953), American paleoanthropologist
- Rowland Beckett, Australian rugby league player
- Roy Beckett (1928–2008), English footballer
- Sam Beckett (skateboarder) (born 1992), British professional skateboarder
- Samuel Beckett (1906–1989), Irish Nobel Prize-winning writer and theatre director
- Sarah Beckett (born 1999), English rugby union player
- Scotty Beckett (1929–1968), American child actor who was a regular in the Our Gang series
- Sheilah Beckett (1913–2013), American illustrator known for her work on the Little Golden Books series
- Simon Beckett (born 1960), British journalist and author
- Stephen Beckett, English actor
- Tanya Beckett (born 1966), English television and radio journalist
- Tavante Beckett (born 1997), American football player
- Ted Beckett (1907–1978), American football player
- Terence Beckett (1923–2013), British businessman
- Thomas W. Naylor Beckett (1839–1906), English-born coffee and tea planter in Ceylon
- Tom Beckett CBE (born 1962), British Army officer
- Tony Beckett (born 1960), former Australian rules footballer
- Vinton Beckett (1923–2018), Jamaican former track and field athlete
- W. N. T. Beckett, MVO, DSC, RN (1893–1941), Royal Navy officer in both World Wars
- Wade Beckett, TV, film and digital producer
- Walter Beckett (composer) (1914–1996), Irish composer
- Wendy Beckett (known as Sister Wendy) (1930–2018), South African nun known for presenting art history documentaries
- William Beckett (disambiguation)

== Fictional characters ==
- Beckett, a vampire in the computer role-playing game Vampire: The Masquerade – Bloodlines (2004)
- Amanda Beckett, the main love interest in the film Can't Hardly Wait (1998)
- Andrew Beckett, the protagonist in the film Philadelphia
- Brandon Beckett, the main character in the film Sniper: Reloaded (2011)
- Carson Beckett, fictional Scottish character in the Canadian-American science fiction television series Stargate Atlantis
- Cutler Beckett, an antagonist in the film series Pirates of the Caribbean
- Kate Beckett, a police officer on the television series Castle
- Captain Maggie Beckett, on the television series Sliders
- Nick Beckett, on the television series Bugs
- Patrick James "PJ" Beckett, from the video game Ace Combat Zero: The Belkan War
- Dr. Sam Beckett, the protagonist of the television series Quantum Leap
- Sgt. Thomas Beckett, the main character in the film Sniper (1993)
- Tobias Beckett, the mentor of Han Solo in Solo: A Star Wars Story (2018)
- Beckett Mariner, main character on the Animated TV series Star Trek: Lower Decks
- Sophia Beckett, main character on Julia Quinn’s book “An Offer From a Gentleman.”

== See also ==
- Becket (disambiguation)
- A'Beckett or à Beckett, a list of people with the surname
