= A'Beckett =

Surname

A'Beckett or à Beckett is a surname. Notable people with the surname include:

- Ada Mary à Beckett (1872–1948) Australian academic
- Arthur A'Beckett (1812–1871), Australian surgeon and politician
- Arthur William à Beckett (1844–1909), English journalist and intellectual
- Edward a'Beckett (cricketer, born 1836) (1836–1922), Australian cricketer
- Edward a'Beckett (cricketer, born 1940) (1940–2011), Australian cricketer
- Gilbert Abbott à Beckett (1811–1856), English humorist
- Gilbert Arthur à Beckett (1837–1891), English writer
- Malwyn a'Beckett (1834–1906), English-born Australian cricketer who played for Victoria
- Mary Anne à Beckett (1815–1863), English composer, primarily known for opera
- Ted à Beckett (1907–1989), Australian cricketer who played in four Tests between 1928 and 1931
- Sir Thomas à Beckett (1836–1919), Australian solicitor and judge
- Thomas Turner à Beckett (1808–1892), lawyer and politician in Victoria, Australia
- William à Beckett (1806–1869), British barrister and the first Chief Justice of the Supreme Court of Victoria
- William Arthur Callendar à Beckett (1833–1901), Australian politician
- William Channing A'Beckett (1846–1928), Australian politician

== See also ==
- Thomas Becket or à Becket (1119/20-1170), murdered Archbishop of Canterbury, Roman Catholic and Anglican saint and martyr
- A'Becketts Creek, Sydney, New South Wales, Australia
- Bechet
- Becket
- Beckett (disambiguation)
- Bucket
