= Becket (disambiguation) =

Becket is a play about Thomas Becket, written in French by Jean Anouilh.

Becket may also refer to:

== Arts and entertainment ==
- Becket (Tennyson play), an 1884 play by Alfred Tennyson
- Becket (1924 film), a silent film based on the play by Alfred Tennyson
- Becket (1964 film), based on a play by Jean Anouilh

== People ==
- Becket Hinckley, American politician
- Edith Becket (1877–1952), English educator
- James Becket, American writer and filmmake
- Jasmine Becket-Griffith, American artist
- John Becket, English member of parliament
- John C. Becket, Scottish born printer in Canada
- MacDonald Becket, American architect
- Marta Becket, American actress, dancer, choreographer and painter
- Mel Becket, American football player
- Samuel Beckett (1906–1989), Irish novelist, playwright, theatre director, and poet
- Samuel Becket Boyd II, American fire chief
- Thomas Becket (1115–1170), martyred Archbishop of Canterbury and Catholic saint
- Thomas Becket, of Donaldson v Becket
- Welton Becket (1902–1969), American architect
- William Becket, English surgeon and antiquary

== Other uses ==
- Becket, Massachusetts, United States, a town
- The Becket School, a secondary school in Nottingham, England
- Becket Fund for Religious Liberty, a non-profit organization based in Washington, D.C.
- Becket, a U-shaped fastener used to hold up a pulley

== See also ==
- Beckett (disambiguation)
- Becket bend, a type of knot joining another line
- Becket hitch, a type of knot connecting another object
