= Edward A'Beckett =

Edward A'Beckett may refer to:

- Ted à Beckett (Edward Lambert a'Beckett, 1907–1989), Australian cricketer
- Edward a'Beckett (cricketer, born 1836) (1836–1922), Australian cricketer
- Edward a'Beckett (cricketer, born 1940) (1940–2011), Australian cricketer

== See also ==
- Edward Beckett, 5th Baron Grimthorpe (born 1954), British peer
