= Robert Beckett (disambiguation) =

Bob, Bobby, Rob, Robbie or Robert Beckett may refer to:

- Bob Beckett (1936-2019), Canadian ice hockey player
- Bob Beckett, American football coach of 1962 Colorado Buffaloes football team
- Bobby Beckett, Canadian politician, see 2014 Toronto municipal election
- Rob Beckett (born 1986), English comedian
- Robbie Beckett (born 1972), American baseball player
- Robbie Beckett (rugby league) (born 1972), Australian rugby league footballer
- Robert Beckett (1862-1917), English-born Australian politician
- Robert Beckett (footballer), 19th century English footballer, see List of Manchester United F.C. players (1–24 appearances)
