= William Beckett =

William Beckett may refer to:

- William Beckett (British politician) (1784–1863), English politician, Member of Parliament for Leeds and Ripon
- Ernest Beckett, 2nd Baron Grimthorpe (Ernest William Beckett, 1856–1917), British politician, sometimes referred to as William Beckett
- William Beckett (engineer) (1862–1956), British railway engineer and soldier
- Gervase Beckett (William Gervase Beckett, 1866–1937), English politician
- William Beckett (Australian politician) (1870–1965), Victorian state politician
- William Beckett (singer) (born 1985), American singer, frontman of the band The Academy Is...

== See also ==
- William à Beckett (1806–1869), Chief Justice of Victoria, Australia
- Billy Beckett (1915–1998), English footballer
- Beckett (disambiguation)
- William Becket (1684–1738), English surgeon and antiquary
