= Richard Beckett =

Richard Beckett may refer to:

- Richard Beckett (cricketer) (1772–1809), English amateur cricketer and captain during the Napoleonic Wars
- Richard Beckett (author) (1936–1987), Australian author and journalist
- Richard Beckett, 3rd Baronet (born 1944) of the Beckett baronets
- Rick Beckett (1954–2009), American radio broadcaster
- Richard B. Beckett (1919–1983), Canadian politician

== See also ==
- Beckett (disambiguation)
