= Bickett =

Bickett is a surname. Notable people with the surname include:

- Duane Bickett (born 1962), American football player
- Fanny Yarborough Bickett (1870–1941), American social worker and political hostess
- Thomas Walter Bickett (1869–1921), American politician

== See also ==
- Beckett
