= Jackson State Tigers and Lady Tigers =

- University: Jackson State University
- Conference: SWAC
- NCAA: Division I FCS
- Athletic director: Ashley Robinson
- Location: Jackson, Mississippi
- Football stadium: Mississippi Veterans Memorial Stadium
- Basketball arena: Williams Assembly Center
- Baseball stadium: Braddy Field
- Nickname: Tigers
- Cheer: "Thee I Love"
- Colors: Navy blue, white, and light blue
- Website: gojsutigers.com

The Jackson State Tigers and Lady Tigers represent Jackson State University, Jackson, Mississippi, in NCAA intercollegiate athletics.

== Conference affiliation ==
Jackson State University's athletic teams participate in the Southwestern Athletic Conference (SWAC) which is a part of the NCAA Division I. Football participates in the Football Championship Subdivision (formerly Division I-AA). Jackson State University's colors are navy blue and white. The nickname of the men's teams is the Tiger; the nickname of the women's teams is the Lady Tigers.

== Sports ==
For men's teams, Jackson State University sponsors Football, Basketball, Baseball, Track and Field, Cross Country, Golf and Tennis. For women's teams, Jackson State University sponsors Basketball, Softball, Track and Field, Cross Country, Tennis, Volleyball, Soccer, Golf and Bowling.

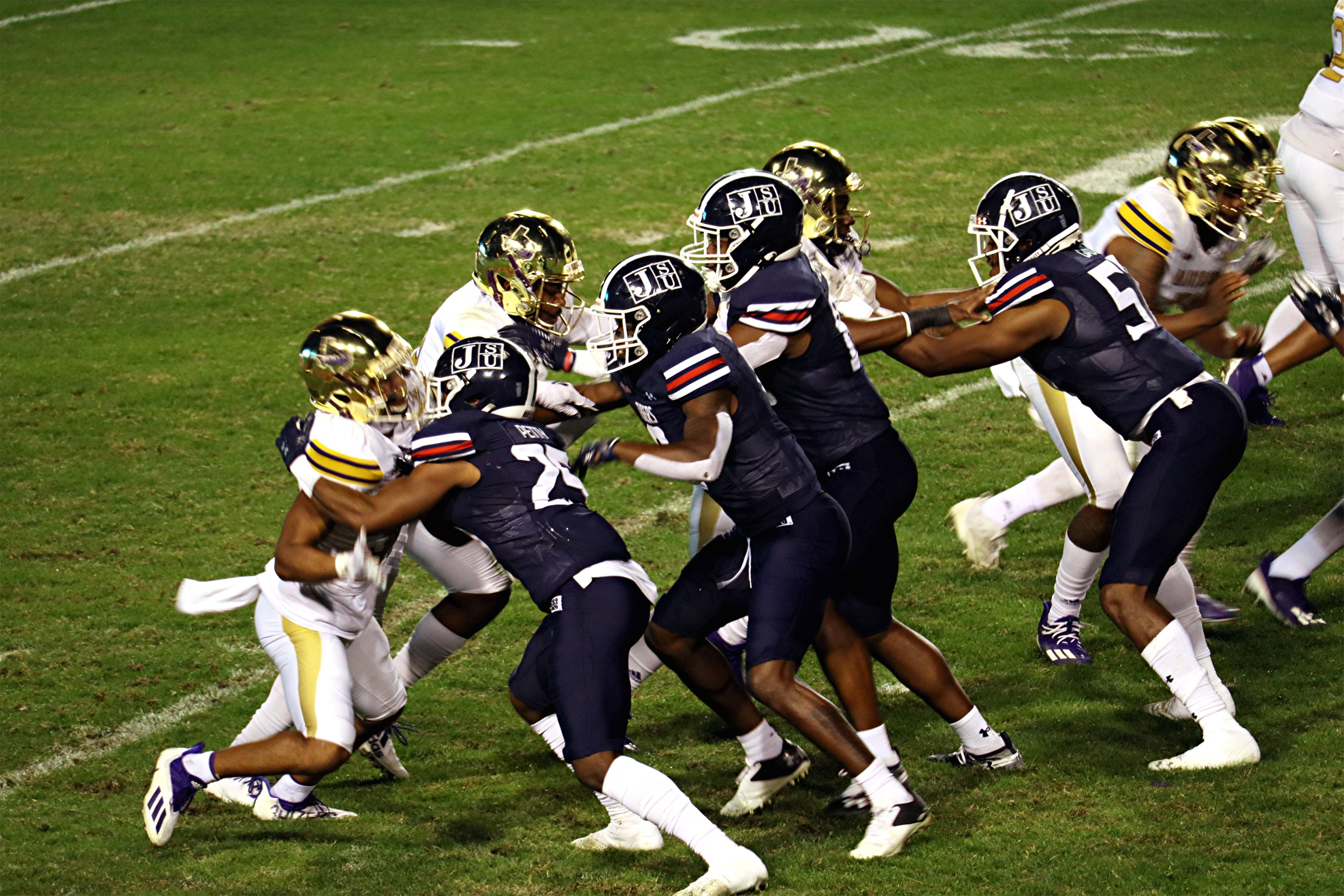
The Jackson State Tigers football team playing against the Prairie View A&M Panthers during the 2021 SWAC Football Championship Game

=== Football ===
==== Annual Football Classics ====
- Every late November, Jackson State plays in-state rival the Alcorn State Braves in the "Soul Bowl" (formerly the Capital City Classic).
- The Tigers play their Louisiana archrival the Southern Jaguars in the popular Jackson State–Southern University rivalry (also known as the BoomBox Classic).
- The Tigers take part in the annual Southern Heritage Classic against the Tennessee State Tigers in Memphis, TN.
- For the Orange Blossom Classic, Jackson State is matched against the Florida A&M Rattlers during Labor Day Weekend in Miami at the Hard Rock Stadium

==== Notable alumni ====
- Coy Bacon
- Lem Barney
- Corey Bradford
- Robert Brazile
- Louis Bullard
- Leslie "Speedy" Duncan
- Harold Jackson
- Eddie Payton
- Walter Payton
- Jackie Slater
- Jimmy Smith

=== Men's basketball ===
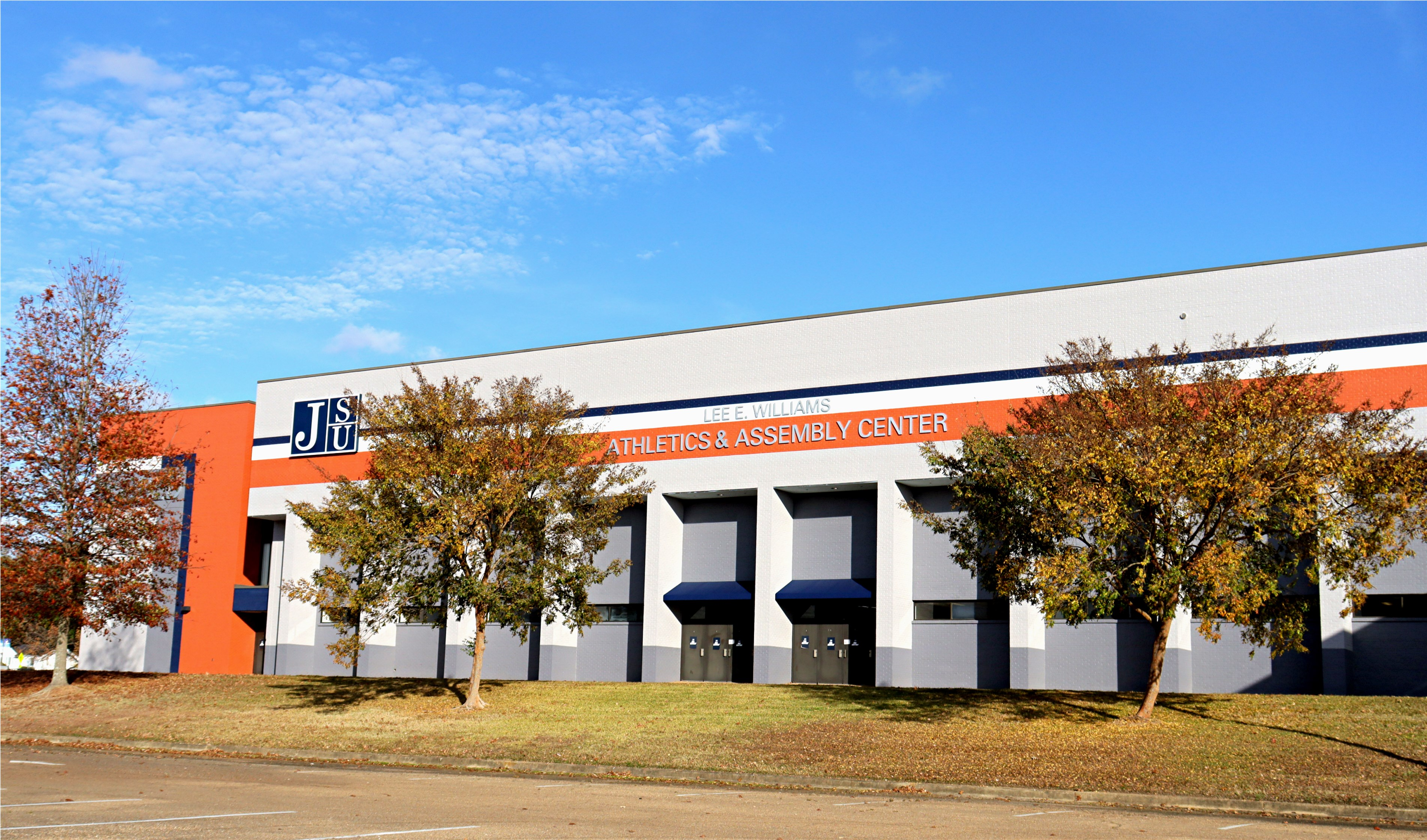
The Lee E. Williams Athletics & Assembly is home of JSU basketball and volleyball

The Tigers have appeared in five NCAA tournaments: 1978, 1991, 1997, 2000, & 2007. As of 2015, the Tigers ranks 4th in the SWAC for number of NCAA appearances. All home games are held at the Williams Assembly Center.

==== Notable alumni ====
- Lindsey Hunter
- Trey Johnson
- Ed Manning
- Audie Norris
- Purvis Short
- Dwayne Whitfield
- Gene Short
- Cleveland Buckner
- Cornell Warner
- Marcus Benard

=== Baseball ===
JSU plays their home games at Braddy Field, constructed in 2006.

==== Notable alumni ====
- Oil Can Boyd
- Robert Braddy
- Wes Chamberlain
- Dave Clark
- Dewon Day
- Howard Farmer
- Mike Farmer
- Curt Ford
- Marvin Freeman
- Kelvin Moore

=== Golf ===
The men's and women's golf teams have dominated the SWAC championships. The men have won 21 championships (1989–2006, 2008–09, 2011), include 18 consecutive, and the women have won nine (1996–97, 2001, 2005–09, 2012).

== National championships ==
=== Team ===
Sport	Association	Division	Year	Opponent/Runner-up	Score
Men's indoor track and field (6)	NAIA	Single	1973	Eastern New Mexico	70–67.5
Men's indoor track and field (6)	NAIA	Single	1975	Eastern New Mexico	57–46
Men's indoor track and field (6)	NAIA	Single	1976	Eastern New Mexico	78–33.17
Men's indoor track and field (6)	NAIA	Single	1977	Oklahoma Christian; Southern	85–38
Men's indoor track and field (6)	NAIA	Single	1978*	Southern	75–48
Men's indoor track and field (6)	NAIA	Single	1979	Abilene Christian	73–53.5
Women's indoor track and field (1)	NAIA	Single	1981	Adams State	149–53
Men's outdoor track and field (1)	NAIA	Single	1977	Adams State	56–31 (+25)

- Asterisk indicates a shared national championship

== Athletic traditions ==
=== Sonic Boom of the South ===
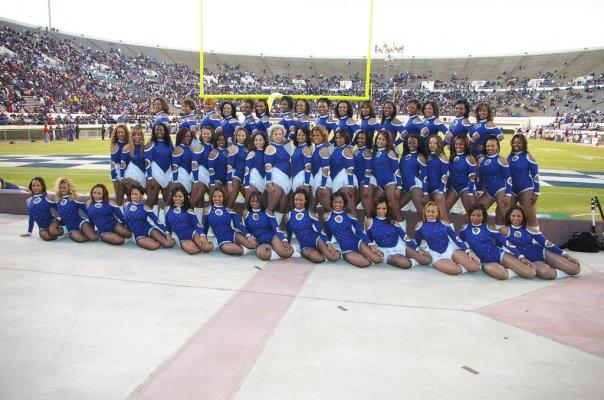

Often accompanying the JSU athletic teams is the university's marching band and dance line. They are nicknamed the Sonic Boom of the South and Prancing J-Settes. The band was first organized in the early 1940s. As early as the mid-1920s, the University had a well-organized orchestra. The group was given the nickname, “The Sonic Boom of the South” by band members in 1971. In 1971, the majorettes abandoned their batons and became a dance team known as the Prancing J-Settes. In 1974, “Get Ready,” an old Motown favorite was selected as the band’s theme song.

Also, during the mid-1970s, the “Tiger Run-On” was perfected. The “Tiger Run-On” is a fast, eye-catching shuffle step that blends an adagio step with an up-tempo shuffle (200 steps per minute), then back to adagio—a “Sonic Boom” trademark that brings fans to their feet during halftime performances. In 2003 the marching band was in enshrined in the NCAA Hall of Champions. Also, the marching band was filmed by Electronic Art Sports (EA Sports) for inclusion in the 2005 version of the video game "EA Sports NCAA Football 2005". The band performs at most football games and most basketball home games.

=== NFL Halftime appearances ===
- Atlanta Falcons
- Detroit Lions
- New Orleans Saints
- New York Jets
- Philadelphia Eagles
- Cincinnati Bengals
- Indianapolis Colts

=== Other appearances ===
- The 1991 NBA All-Star Game
- The Motown’s 30th Anniversary television special.
- The NAACP 34th Image Awards television special.

== See also ==
- List of black college football classics
- Honda Battle of the Bands
