= Charles Beckett =

Charles Beckett may refer to:

- Charles Beckett (cricketer) (1794–1838), English cricketer
- Charles Beckett (politician) (born 1958), American politician in the Mississippi House of Representatives
- Charles Edward Beckett (1849–1925), brigadier-general and cavalry officer in the British Army
