= Ray Beckett =

Ray Beckett may refer to:

- Ray Beckett (journalist) (1903–1983), Australian journalist
- Ray Beckett (sound engineer), British sound engineer
