= John Beckett =

John Beckett may refer to:

== Politicians ==
- Sir John Beckett, 2nd Baronet (1775–1847), British lawyer and Tory politician
- John Beckett (politician) (1894–1964), British Labour Party then far right politician

== Others ==
- John Beckett (American football) (1892–1981), American college football player
- John Beckett (GC) (1906–1947), Royal Air Force airman
- John Beckett, Lord Beckett, Scottish judge of the Supreme Courts
- John S. Beckett (1927–2007), Irish musician, composer, and conductor
- John R. Beckett (1918–2010), American businessman
- John Beckett (historian) (born 1950), professor of English regional history
- John Beckett (born 1958), guitarist with Adam and the Ants, stage name Johnny Bivouac.
