= Malwyn a'Beckett =

English-born Australian cricketer

Malwyn a'Beckett (26 September 1834 – 25 June 1906) was an English-born Australian cricketer who played for Victoria. He was born in London and died in Sale, Victoria.

A'Beckett made a single first-class appearance for the side, during the 1851–52 season, against Tasmania. From the tailend, he scored three runs in the first innings and seven in the second.

Six seasons later, he played in a Gentlemen v Players match on a Gentlemen's team which won by an innings margin.

A'Beckett's brother, Edward, played two first-class matches for Victoria, while his great-nephew, Ted played four Test matches for Australia.
