= Old Wykehamists cricket team =

The Old Wykehamist cricket team was a first-class cricket team made up of former students of Winchester College in Winchester, England.

== History ==
The team played one match with first-class status in July 1817 against the Old Etonians at Lord's, winning the match by 72 runs. The modern day Old Wykehamist Cricket Club was founded in 1874.

== Old Etonians v Old Wykehamists, 1817 ==
Old Wykehamists
185 all out
&
108 all out
Won by 72 runs

William Deedes 59
Charles Beckett 4/?

Thomas Howard 43
William Roberts 3/?

Lord's, London
Umpires: Not known

Old Etonians
81 all out
&
140 all out

Henry Barnard 20
Thomas Howard 4/?

Edward Woodbridge & Frederick Crowder 35
Thomas Howard 3/?
