= Alex Beckett =

Alex Beckett may refer to:

- Alex Beckett (footballer)
- Alex Beckett (actor)
- Alexander Beckett (diver)
