= James Beckett =

James Beckett may refer to:

- James Beckett (statistician), American statistician, former editor/publisher of Beckett Media
- James Beckett (politician) (1875–1938), Irish politician
- James Beckett (water polo) (1884–1971), Irish water polo player
- J. C. Beckett (James Camlin Beckett, 1912–1996), Northern Irish historian
