= Edith Becket =

British educator (1877–1952)

Edith Mary Becket
- Born: 4 June 1877 Nottingham
- Died: 13 October 1952
- Occupations: Lecturer in Education, University College Nottingham

Edith Mary Becket (4 June 1877 – 1952) was a lecturer in Education at University College Nottingham who wrote the first institutional history of the University College Nottingham and was an early biographer of Nottingham born mathematician George Green.

== Early life and education ==
Becket was born in Nottingham on 4 June 1877. Her father, Robert, was a wine merchant who died in 1882 whilst Edith was only a young child. After his death she continued to live with her mother Mary (d. 1923) at the family home of 197 Woodborough Road, Nottingham. After attending Brincliffe School in Nottingham, Becket enrolled at University College Nottingham, becoming one of the College's first women students. She passed her intermediate exam in Arts in 1896, and subsequently obtained her first degree in 1898, at that time awarded by the University of London, followed by her teaching diploma in 1920 from the University of Cambridge.

== Career ==
Becket taught for one year as Assistant Mistress at Nottingham Girls High School. In 1900 she was appointed as a member of staff in the Day Training College at University College, Nottingham and remained there until her retirement in 1947. Becket was a senior lecturer in Education and tutor to the women students in the Secondary Training Department. This was at a time when very few women tutors were employed at the University College. In 1922 Becket was awarded an MA (again from the University of London) for her dissertation The Development of Education in Nottingham during the Nineteenth and early Twentieth Centuries, with Special Reference to the History of University College. Between 1912 and 1927 Becket taught history at the University College.

Becket's main interest was the history of education. In 1928 she wrote the first single-volume history of the University College, entitled The University College of Nottingham, at the time of its move to a new site at University Park. The history details the origins of the University College as a 'child of the city'. It was one of three publications produced by members of staff at Nottingham in the 1920s and 1950s, which provided 'first-hand accounts of events by insiders with a close knowledge of the college and its staff'. In 1936 she was awarded a PhD for her thesis on The History of Education and of Educational Institutions in Nottinghamshire excluding the City of Nottingham from 1800–1930.

Becket is a figure in letters written by the writer D.H.Lawrence who was a student at University College Nottingham 1906–1908. The original letters are held within the D.H. Lawrence Collection at the University of Nottingham Manuscripts and Special Collections. As well as her work on education, and on education in Nottinghamshire in particular, Becket was an active member of the Bromley House Library in Nottingham. She wrote an article on the Nottingham mathematician George Green, which was published in The Transactions of the Thoroton Society in 1921. This was important according to later George Green biographer Mary Cannell as it was the first biography of the mathematician to be produced. It is also thought she was the first to discover the link between George Green and Bromley House Library, where he was able to develop his mathematical knowledge and widen his social network. Becket's work resulted in attempts to link George Green with his mill, an article by S.F. Wilson appearing in The Miller in 1924 which was based on Dr Becket's paper. Becket also encouraged the education of women, and, at a 1936 prizegiving, exhorted the graduating female pupils to continue to attend evening classes, to continue their education, even after leaving school.

At the time of her death on 13 October 1952, she was living at 38 Carisbrooke Drive, Mapperley Park, Nottingham. Papers relating to her research are held at the University of Nottingham Manuscripts and Special Collections (MS 559).

== Publications ==
- Becket, Edith (1921) George Green, Mathematician 1793–1841, Transactions of the Thoroton Society, Nottingham
- Becket, Edith (1928) The University College of Nottingham, Nottingham
- Becket, Edith (1936) The History of Education and of Educational Institutions in Nottinghamshire excluding the City of Nottingham from 1800–1930, Thesis, University of Nottingham
