= Old Etonians cricket team =

First-class cricket team

The Old Etonians cricket team was a first-class cricket team made up of former students of Eton College in Eton, England.

== History ==
The team played four matches with first-class status, with its first appearance in first-class cricket coming against the Gentlemen of England at Lord's Old Ground in May 1791. The following month Old Etonians played the Marylebone Cricket Club at Burley-on-the-Hill, before the Old Westminsters in 1793. 23 years elapsed before Old Etonians next first-class match, in 1816 against the Gentlemen of England. The following year the team made its final appearance in first-class cricket against the Old Wykehamists.

== Players ==
See Category:Old Etonians cricketers
