= Edward Milward =

English physician and historian (c. 1712–1757)

Edward Milward (c. 1712–1757) was an English physician and historian of medicine.

== Life ==
He was born about 1712, probably at Lindridge, Worcestershire, where his family resided. He was entered at Trinity College, Cambridge, but left without graduating, and acquired the degree of doctor of medicine abroad.

In 1733 Milward was a doctor of medicine, living in London at Queen's Square, Ormond Street; he later moved to Portugal Row, Lincoln's Inn Fields. At this period he was patron to Edmund Chapman, the writer on midwifery.

On 7 July 1741 he was created by royal mandate M.D. of Cambridge as a member of Trinity College. He was admitted licentiate of the College of Physicians 30 September 1747, and fellow 30 September 1748; was censor 1752, and in the same year delivered the Harveian oration. He became Fellow of the Royal Society 21 January 1742.

Milward moved to Worcester, where he died 26 August 1757. He was buried in the Knighton Chapel, Lindridge, among other members of his family. His epitaph states that he died at the age of 45.

== Works ==
Milward was a scholar of the classical medical writers. His major work was his essay on Alexander Trallianus, a Greek physician of the sixth century. Milward intended this essay to be the prelude to a new edition of the text of Alexander. Another project was in his Letter to Learned Men: a complete history of British writers on medicine and surgery. He started with the papers of William Becket, bought from Edmund Curll the bookseller. He again referred to it in the preface to James Drake's Orationes Tres, but nothing was published. Another projected but unpublished work was a treatise on gangrene.

His published works were:

- The Essay on Trallianus, with different title-pages in 1733 and 1734.
- A Circular Invitatory Letter to all Orders of Learned Men … concerning an Attempt towards an History of the Lives, etc., of the most celebrated British Physical and Chirurgical Writers, London, 1740.
- Oratio Harvæana, 1752, London, 1753.

Milward also edited Jacobi Drakei Orationes tres de febre intermittente, London, 1742.
