= Thoroton Society of Nottinghamshire =

Historical society (est. 1897)

The Thoroton Society of Nottinghamshire, generally known as the Thoroton Society, is Nottinghamshire’s principal historical and archaeological society. It was established in 1897, and takes its name from Dr Robert Thoroton who published the first county history of Nottinghamshire in 1677. It is a registered charity.

== Aims ==
To promote knowledge, understanding and appreciation of the history, archaeology and antiquities of Nottinghamshire, and to support local research and conservation.

== Governance ==
The society is governed by the Officers and Council of the Thoroton Society elected at the Annual General Meeting. The current president is Professor John Beckett BA(Hons) PhD HonDLitt FRHistS FSA.

== Publications ==
The society has two main series of publications:

- The Transactions of the Thoroton Society – published annually since 1897. The Transactions contain articles and reports describing the results of research into aspects of local history and archaeology.
- Thoroton Society Record Series – a monographic series published occasionally since 1903. 47 volumes had been published by 2014. The Society functions as the record society for Nottinghamshire, and in this series publishes historical documents of significance for the county's history.
