= Thomas W. Naylor Beckett =

Sri Lankan botanist (1838–1906)

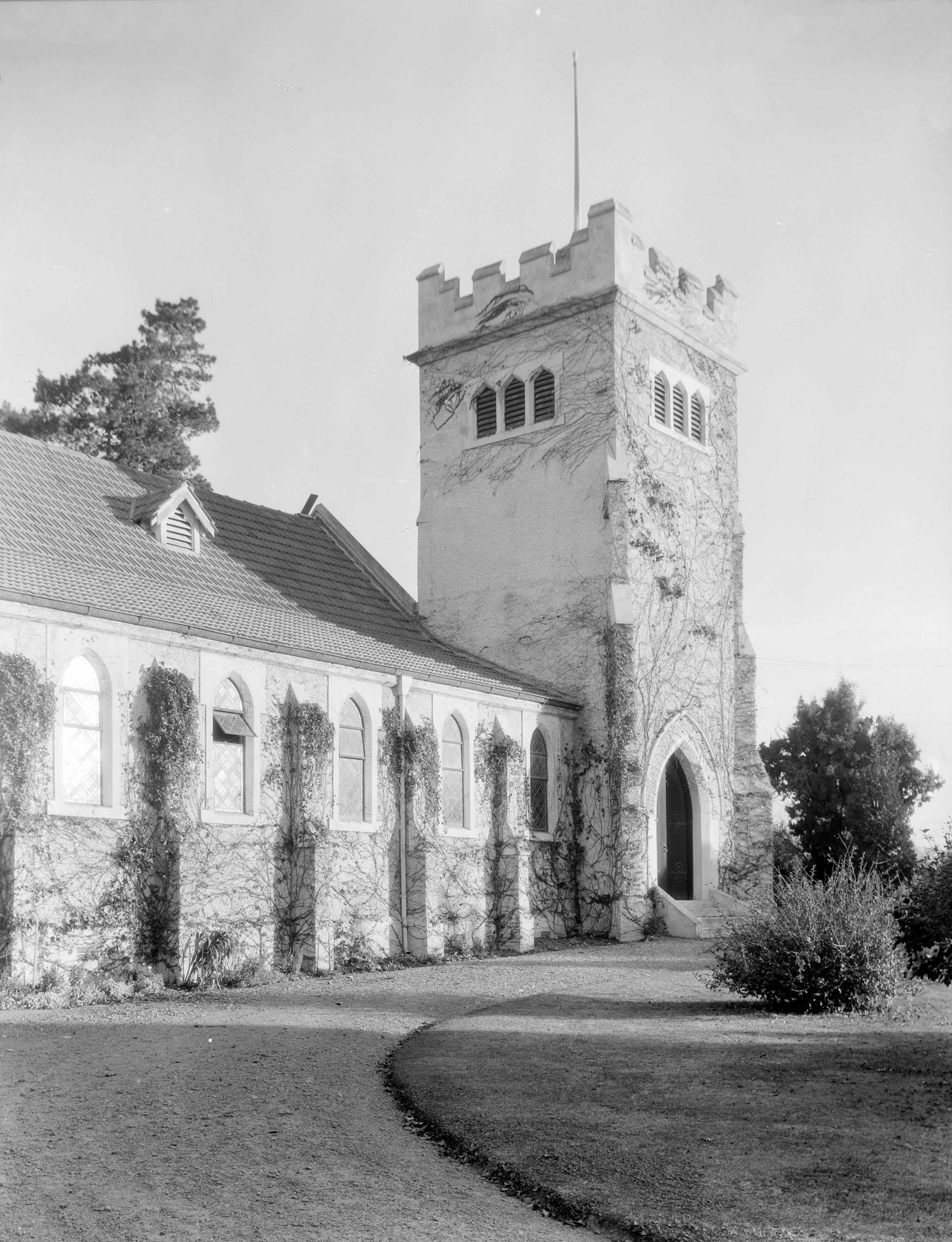
St. Barnabas’ Church, Fendalton

Thomas Wrench Naylor Beckett (24 July 1839 Liverpool – 5 December 1906 "Elbedde", Fendalton) was an English-born coffee and tea planter in Ceylon and a noted botanist and bryologist, who collected specimens there and in the north-western Himalaya between 1882 and c.1900. He did not publish any account of the mosses he collected while in Ceylon – many of his specimens though are recorded in Max Fleischer's "Musci der Flora von Buitenzorg". He emigrated to New Zealand where he also collected. His main pteridophyte collection is at World Museum Liverpool. His bryophyte material at Kew was transferred to the British Museum of Natural History in about 1961 in terms of the Morton Agreement. The University of Canterbury and Christchurch houses some 12,000 of his specimens. Specimens are also cared for at the National Herbarium of Victoria (MEL), Royal Botanic Gardens Victoria, Australia. Beckett was one of three amateur bryologists active in Christchurch, the other two being Robert Brown (1824–1906) and Thomas George Wright (1831–1914).

Beckett was married to Sarah Tolson Clint (1838 – 8 June 1921) and had children. His son, Alfred Charles, died on the island at four and a half years old on 24 December 1878. When their crops also failed, the family relocated to New Zealand and settled in Fendalton in 1884, where Beckett worked as an orchardist. A Fellow of the Linnean Society and a member of the Canterbury Philosophical Institute, Beckett was well known in scientific circles throughout the world. The study of mosses and lichens was his main field of interest, and he left behind a valuable collection of New Zealand and foreign mosses. When Beckett first settled in Christchurch he corresponded with several local botanists, including Thomas George Wright, requesting information on matters bryological in the country, and offering to exchange specimens. Beckett kept all the replies, and these together with his botanical correspondence, local and overseas, was kept by the Canterbury Museum. His favourite collecting sites for mosses were in the Port Hills and the foothills. There were plants from New Zealand, Nepal, Sri Lanka, South Africa and French Polynesia in his collection.

Beckett took a great interest in primary school education, and was chairman of the Fendalton School Committee. He was a serious churchman, being closely associated with St. Barnabas’ Church for more than 20 years, and being a churchwarden for 17 years. In 1896 he was placed in charge of the construction of the Sunday School building on glebe land in Clyde Road. At his death, from influenza which developed into pneumonia, Beckett was one of the oldest and most respected residents of the area, and was buried in the graveyard at St Paul's Anglican Church, Papanui. With Beckett are buried his wife Sarah, and his unmarried daughters, Mary Ethel (1871–1947) and Amy Middleton (1876–1964). The gravestone inscription also commemorates Alfred Charles Beckett. A window of St. Barnabas’ Church is dedicated to the memory of Thomas Wrench Naylor Beckett, while a lamp in the church grounds is dedicated to the Becketts' son, Thomas Herbert Beckett, who was vestryman, church warden, choir member and synodsman of the Church.

Children:

1. Beckett, Thomas Herbert 1870
2. Beckett, Mary Ethel 1871
3. Beckett, Alfred Charles 1874
4. Beckett, Amy Middleton 1876
5. Beckett, Frederick Percy
