= Claire Beckett =

American photographer (born 1978)

- Born: 1978 (age 47–48); Chicago, Illinois, U.S.
- Education: Kenyon College (BA); Massachusetts College of Art and Design (MFA)
- Known for: Photography
- Website: clairebeckett.com

Claire Beckett (born 1978) is an American photographer known for her exploration of post-9/11 America.

== Early life and education ==
Born in Chicago, Illinois, Beckett lives and works in Boston, Massachusetts. She became interested in photography early in life and began to make pictures at the age of 16. Beckett went on to earn a BA in anthropology at Kenyon College, and served as a Peace Corps Volunteer in Benin, West Africa, before earning an MFA in photography from the Massachusetts College of Art (MassArt).

== Career ==
Beckett prefers to work with a large-format 4×5 film camera. She has been a visiting faculty member from 2011-2018 at the School of the Museum of Fine Arts at Tufts.

Beckett's projects include In Training, a look at young soldiers prior to deployment; Hearts and Minds, an investigation of the depiction of Arabs and Muslims during military training exercises; and The Converts, in which she photographed American converts to Islam.

Beckett's work is held in the collections of the Museum of Fine Arts, Boston; Nelson-Atkins Museum of Art, Kansas City; Wadsworth Atheneum, Hartford; and the Massachusetts Institute of Technology, Cambridge. She has received an Artadia Award, and was artist-in-residence at Light Work. She also worked in a Sufi community in upstate New York.

Her work has been featured in Artforum, Public Culture, and the Boston Globe.

Beckett's time as a Peace Corps Volunteer in Benin (2002-2004) had a significant impact on her artwork. She served as a community health worker, living in a rural town with a mixed population of Christians, Muslims, and practitioners of Vodun, the local traditional faith. During these years, the United States was at war in Afghanistan and Iraq. The experience of deep cultural immersion, coupled with hearing firsthand her Beninese neighbors' criticism of the wars, caused Beckett to view her home country with new eyes. Since then, themes of military training and the tension surrounding Islam in America have been prominent in her work.

== Selected exhibitions ==
=== Solo ===
- Simulating Iraq, Bernard Toale Gallery, Boston, Massachusetts (2007)
- You Are..., Carroll and Sons Gallery (2011)
- Claire Beckett: Matrix 163, Wadsworth Atheneum, Hartford, Connecticut (2011)
- The Converts, Carroll and Sons Gallery, Boston, Massachusetts (2016)

=== Group ===
- Warzone, Noorderlicht Photography Festival, Leeuwarden, Netherlands (2010)
- Reality Check, Fotodok, Utrecht, Netherlands (2011)
- The Workers, Massachusetts Museum of Contemporary Art, North Adams, Massachusetts (2011)
- Character Study, DeCordova Museum and Sculpture Park, Lincoln, Massachusetts (2013)
- American Soldier, Nelson-Atkins Museum of Art, Kansas City, Missouri (2015)
- The Outwin 2016: American Portraiture Today, National Portrait Gallery, Washington, DC (2016)
- On Freedom, curated by For Freedom, Aperture Foundation, New York, New York (2017)
- Be Strong and Do Not Betray Your Soul, Light Work, Syracuse, New York (2018)
