= Becket Hinckley =

American politician

Member of the Wyoming House of Representatives from the 41st district
- In office January 14, 2003 – January 9, 2007
- Preceded by: Mac McGraw
- Succeeded by: Ken Esquibel

Personal details
- Born: August 1, 1970 (age 55) Basin, Wyoming
- Party: Republican

Becket Hinckley (born August 1, 1970) is an American politician who served in the Wyoming House of Representatives from the 41st district from 2003 to 2007.
