= Ada Mary à Beckett =

Australian educationist (1872–1948)

Ada Mary à Beckett CBE
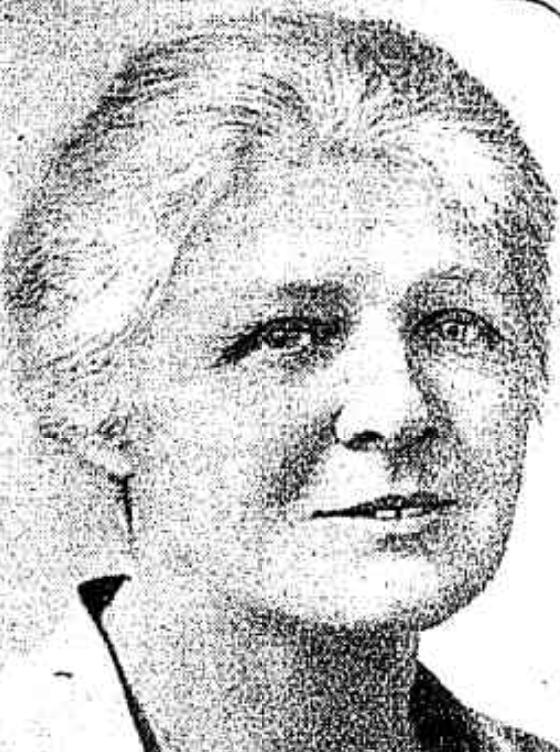
- Ada Mary à Beckett, c. 1929
- Born: 18 May 1872; Adelaide, South Australia
- Died: 20 May 1948 (aged 76)
- Occupations: Biologist; Academic
- Known for: Founder of the Free Kindergaten Union; First female lecturer appointed by Melbourne University

Ada Mary à Beckett MSc CBE (18 May 1872 – 20 May 1948), née Lambert, was an Australian biologist, academic and leader of the kindergarten movement in Australia. She was the first woman appointed lecturer at Melbourne University.

== History ==
Ada Mary Lambert was born in Adelaide, the eldest daughter of Rev. Henry John Lambert (c. 1836 – 14 July 1924) and Helen Lambert, née Garrett ( – 10 October 1914), of Norwood, South Australia. Her father was born in London, and was a Baptist pastor in King's Lynn, Norfolk and emigrated to South Australia to take charge of the Baptist church at Moonta, South Australia around 1860. He was appointed the first pastor of the Baptist church at Norwood in 1867 and served there until October 1888, when he left for England. Around 1890 he returned to South Australia, where he joined the Presbyterian Church, and served at Spalding, Koolunga, and Wallaroo, then in 1905 succeeded Matthew Johnson as Moderator of the South Australian General Assembly of the Presbyterian Church. He later moved to Victoria, and died at his daughter Ada's home in East St Kilda.

Ada was educated at the Advanced School for Girls in Adelaide, and gained her BSc. (the second woman to graduate in Science at M.U.) and MSc. degrees at Melbourne University in 1895 and 1897 respectively, and was the recipient of several awards and scholarships. She was appointed demonstrator and assistant lecturer at the University during W. Baldwin Spencer's anthropological tour of Central Australia in 1901. This was the university's first appointment of a woman as lecturer.

In 1903, Ada married solicitor Thomas Archibald à Beckett, the eldest son of Sir Thomas à Beckett; they had three sons. She returned to teaching at the Melbourne Church of England Girls' Grammar School, and served as demonstrator in biology at Melbourne University. She lectured in biology at Scotch College, Melbourne, and was a member of the Council of the Federation of University Women. She was a founder of the Free Kindergarten Union, and served it for 40 years. A pioneer of the Kindergarten Training College in Victoria, she was also president of the Australian Association for Pre-school Child Development.

== Recognition ==
- She was appointed a CBE in 1935.
- A portrait by Charles Wheeler hangs in the Institute of Early Childhood Development, Kew, Victoria.
- A kindergarten in Port Melbourne and a scholarship for kindergarten teachers are named for her.

== Family ==
She married Thomas Archibald à Beckett (1868–1930) on 19 February 1903. He was the eldest son of Justice Sir Thomas à Beckett (1836–1919). Their children included Edward Lambert ("Ted") à Beckett (11 August 1907 – 2 June 1989), a noted cricketer.

They had a residence on Lansdowne Street, East St Kilda, Victoria, where she died on 20 May 1948. Her remains were cremated, following a service at St George's Church, East St Kilda.
