= John C. Becket =

John C. Becket (May 14, 1810 - September 5, 1879) was a Scottish born printer who practiced his craft in Montreal after 1832.

Becket, who was born in Kilwinning, Scotland, immigrated to New York in 1831 and moved to Canada after a few months. He and four contemporary printers were described as "ancestors of the profession" in Montreal
