= Douglas Beckett =

English cricketer

Personal information
- Full name: Douglas Keith Beckett
- Born: 29 August 1959 (age 67); Hampton, Middlesex, England
- Nickname: Ethel
- Height: 6 ft 2 in (1.88 m)
- Batting: Right-handed
- Bowling: Right-arm medium

Domestic team information
- Years: Team
- 1978–1979: Cheshire
- 1979: Minor Counties North
- 1980–1981: Lancashire

Career statistics
Competition	List A
Matches	8
Runs scored	78
Batting average	11.14
100s/50s	–/–
Top score	30
Balls bowled	66
Wickets	2
Bowling average	18.00
5 wickets in innings	–
10 wickets in match	–
Best bowling	2/23
Catches/stumpings	–/–
- Source: Cricinfo, 9 July 2012

Douglas Keith Beckett (born 9 August 1959) is a former English cricketer. Beckett was a right-handed batsman who bowled right-arm medium pace. He was born at Hampton, Middlesex.

Beckett made his debut in county cricket for Cheshire against Staffordshire in the 1978 Minor Counties Championship. He made nine further Minor Counties Championship appearances for the county, the last of which came against Durham in 1979. It was in 1979 that Beckett was selected to play for Minor Counties North in the 1979 Benson & Hedges Cup, making a single List A appearance against Nottinghamshire. The following season he joined Lancashire, making his debut for the county in a List A match against Worcestershire in the 1980 Gillette Cup. He made six further List A appearances for Lancashire, the last of which came against Gloucestershire in the 1981 John Player League. In his seven List A matches for the county, he scored 77 runs at an average of 12.83, with a high score of 30. With the ball, he took 2 wickets at a bowling average of 18.00, with best figures of 2/23. He made no appearances in first-class cricket for Lancashire.
