= Ann Beckett =

Irish occupational therapist (1927–2002)

Ann Beckett (5 February 1927 – 2002) was an Irish pioneer of occupational therapy, a sister of John Beckett (an Irish musician, composer and conductor) and Peter Beckett (a pioneering figure in Irish psychiatry). She was a cousin of the famous writer and playwright Samuel Beckett.

== Early life ==
Ann and her twin brother John were born in Sandymount, Dublin to Gerald and Peggy Beckett. Gerald, brother of Bill Beckett (Samuel Beckett’s father), studied medicine at Trinity College Dublin and became County Medical Officer for Wicklow. When she was ten years old she got an infection in her leg which caused a lot of pain and which required surgical intervention. At 14 her lower leg was amputated.

== Family ==
Ann's father Gerald Beckett was capped for Irish rugby and water polo; captained a golf club, swam and played the piano. Her twin brother John later became musician, composer and conductor in the realm of early music and was best known in Ireland for his direction of the famous series of Bach Cantatas, performed during February in St Ann's Church, Dawson Street, Dublin, which began in 1973 and lasted for ten years. Ann's older brother Peter Beckett became the first Professor of Psychiatry and later the Dean of Medicine in Trinity College, Dublin.

== Training and career ==
She commenced training in Dorset House School of Occupational Therapy in Bromsgrove, Worcestershire in 1945, graduated in 1948 and returned to Ireland where she organized an interview with the then Minister for Health Noel Browne to discuss the possibilities for Occupational Therapy in the health care system. Due to the untrained ex-patients, nurses and craft people claiming the role the Minister could not see any openings for professional occupational therapists. She got a position with the Irish branch of the British Red Cross becoming the first professionally qualified occupational therapist employed in Ireland. Ann pioneered the profession in Ireland, establishing Occupational Therapy Departments in Cherry Orchard Hospital, Dublin in 1954 and in the Central Remedial Clinic in Dublin in 1956. Ann Beckett is one of the founding members of the Association of Occupational Therapists of Ireland. In later years Ann taught in St Joseph’s College of Occupational Therapy, Dun Laoighre.

== Legacy ==
On Ann Beckett’s death in 2002 she willed money to the Association of Occupational Therapists of Ireland, which resulted in her colleagues and friends setting up the Ann Beckett Award Committee, a sub-committee of the AOTI. The purpose of this committee is to celebrate her life and work and to showcase interventions that demonstrate the core principals of Occupational Therapy. This annual award has been presented each year since 2004 at the AOTI annual conference and is the most prestigious award given in Occupational Therapy in Ireland.
