= Ronald G. Beckett =

American paleoanthropologist

Ronald G. Beckett (born in Yuma, Arizona on January 3, 1953) is an American paleoanthropologist, and Professor Emeritus in the Department of Biomedical Sciences at Quinnipiac University. In 1999, he and Gerald Conlogue founded the Bioanthropology Research Institute at the university. He is a Fellow of the American Association for Respiratory Care (FAARC) and is a Fulbright Scholar Senior Specialist in Anthropology.

== Life ==
Beckett began his career as a respiratory therapist and became a supervisor at Tucson General Hospital in Tucson, Arizona, in 1977. While there he was an instructor for the Pima Community College's program in respiratory care, as well as an instructor to medical interns and residents regarding topics in mechanical life support. As part of his teaching responsibilities, Beckett taught endoscopy assisting to students of respiratory therapy. Beckett began working closely with physicians, primarily pulmonologists, to develop and perfect endoscopy procedures in the medical setting. Among the procedures developed were how to maximize the yield of tissue biopsies of the human lung. In addition, Beckett was involved with developing ways to maximize both the diagnostic and therapeutic applications of endoscopy.

Beckett moved to Rhode Island in 1983, where he established the first college-based program in Respiratory Care in the state at the Community College of Rhode Island. Not long after the program was accredited, Beckett moved to Hamden, Connecticut, where he became director of the bachelor's degree program in Respiratory Care at Quinnipiac University. He soon became Chairman of the department of Cardiopulmonary Sciences and Diagnostic Imaging, a position he held for 23 years. While at Quinnipiac University, Beckett developed programs in Cardiovascular Perfusion and laid the groundwork for the Graduate program for Physician Assistants. He also served as Chairman of the All-College Senate. In addition to his primary responsibilities in teaching in the cardiopulmonary sciences, Beckett taught courses in Anatomy and Physiology and Pathophysiology. During this period, Beckett also worked as a bedside Respiratory Care practitioner at Yale-New Haven Hospital in New Haven, Connecticut, where he helped guide physicians in bronchoscopic techniques on patients who were being mechanically ventilated. His interest in pulmonary medicine and xenotransplantation led him to conduct research on swine lung anatomy. With input from Conlogue, Beckett modeled the internal swine lung anatomy using vinyl and silicone molding methods. Internal examinations of the swine lung were conducted using varied endoscopic methods. In 1996 he completed his PhD in Educational Leadership with a focus on critical thinking and autonomous learning from the University of Connecticut.

Following a conversation with co-author Conlogue regarding mummy research, Beckett realized the endoscopic imaging potential in bioanthropological settings. He began conducting experiments using the combination of radiography and endoscopy in the laboratory setting. Finding that the techniques were complementary, Beckett began to work with Conlogue on projects involving the paleoimaging of mummified remains in 1996. Following the initial work in the Cardiopulmonary Sciences laboratory, Beckett began to apply endoscopy in concert with radiography on the Max Uhle collection of mummies from Pachacamac Peru at the University of Pennsylvania in Philadelphia, Pennsylvania. Techniques were further developed through paleoimaging projects involving mummified remains at the Yale Peabody Museum of Natural History in New Haven, Connecticut.

As Beckett and Conlogue began to present their work at professional symposia, in particular the Paleopathology Association annual meetings, it became apparent that the ‘house call’ approach to paleoimaging was greatly desired by the Bioanthropological community of scientists. Adopting the field approach, Beckett and Conlogue received many invitations to varied global locations to conduct on-site paleoimaging projects. Beckett continued to refine and develop new field techniques and skills in bioanthropological data collection using endoscopic instrumentation.

In 1999, Beckett, along with Conlogue, co-founded the Bioanthropology Research Institute at Quinnipiac University. Beckett’s work with mummified remains has been featured in many television documentaries regarding paleoimaging on the Discovery and Learning Channels. Beckett and Conlogue’s field paleoimaging work caught the interest of the National Geographic Channel and they served as co-hosts for a three-year, 40 episode documentary series called The Mummy Road Show. Their work with National Geographic took them to over 13 countries conducting paleoimaging research on mummified remains and artifacts. In 2005, they published Mummy Dearest (Lyons Press), a behind the scenes look and in depth account of their experiences producing the series. In the fall of 2009 CRC Press published their second book, Paleoimaging, Field Applications for Cultural Remains and Artifacts.

Beckett has developed and teaches academic courses in Mummy Science. He continues to be an invited speaker at many universities as well as at domestic and international scientific symposia. He continues to conduct paleoimaging research and gives public presentations for museums and civic organizations.
