= Mike Farmer (baseball) =

American baseball player (born 1968)

- Pitcher
- Born: July 3, 1968 (age 57); Gary, Indiana, U.S.
- Batted: Switch Threw: Left

MLB debut
- May 4, 1996, for the Colorado Rockies

Last MLB appearance
- June 8, 1996, for the Colorado Rockies

MLB statistics
- Win–loss record: 0–1
- Earned run average: 7.71
- Strikeouts: 16

KBO statistics
- Win–loss record: 11–11
- Earned run average: 4.84
- Strikeouts: 101
- Stats at Baseball Reference

Teams
- Colorado Rockies (1996); Doosan Bears (2000–2001)

Michael Anthony Farmer (born July 3, 1968) is a former Major League Baseball left-handed pitcher.

Farmer played college baseball as an outfielder at Jackson State and was signed by the Philadelphia Phillies as an amateur free agent in 1989. During a blowout minor league game with the Clearwater Phillies, Farmer joked about being able to pitch. He was inserted into the game on the mound and performed well enough that the Phillies continued to give him more chances on the mound before converting him to pitching full-time in 1993.

Farmer would make his Major League Baseball debut with the Colorado Rockies on May 4, 1996, and appeared in his final game on June 8, 1996.
