= Tony Beckett =

Australian rules footballer

Personal information
- Full name: Tony Beckett
- Born: 26 June 1960 (age 66)
- Original team: Mayne (QFL)
- Height: 182 cm (6 ft 0 in)
- Weight: 73 kg (161 lb)

Playing career^{1}
| Years | Club | Games (Goals) |
| 1987 | Brisbane Bears | 6 (2) |
- ^{1} Playing statistics correct to the end of 1987.

Tony Beckett (born 26 June 1960) is a former Australian rules footballer who played with the Brisbane Bears in the Victorian Football League (VFL).

Beckett, a left footer, started out at Everton Districts before joining Queensland Football League (QFL) side Mayne. A wingman, he was a member of Mayne's 1982 premiership team. Beckett was Queensland interstate representative on 18 occasions and captained his state in 1985.

Beckett got his opportunity to play VFL football in 1987, when local club Brisbane entered the league and he was the first player recruited locally to debut. His first appearance came in round five against Melbourne at Carrara Oval and he had 19 disposals as well as a goal. Beckett played just five more senior games for the Bears.
