= Lenny Beckett =

Australian rugby footballer

Personal information
- Full name: Lenny Beckett
- Born: 13 May 1980 (age 45); Camperdown, New South Wales
- Height: 1.77 m (5 ft 10 in)
- Weight: 88 kg (13 st 12 lb)

Playing information

Rugby league
- Position: Wing, Centre
Club
Years	Team	Pld	T	G	FG	P
1999–00	Newcastle Knights	27	13	0	0	52
2001–02	Northern Eagles	32	7	0	0	28
	Total	59	20	0	0	80

Rugby union
Club
Years	Team	Pld	T	G	FG	P
2003–05	Brumbies	10	0	0	0	0
- As of 15 Jul 2021
- Education: Westfields Sports High School
- Relatives: Robbie Beckett (brother)

Lenny Beckett is an Australian rugby league and rugby union footballer. He is a member of the Brumbies organisation, noted for his strong defensive game. After making his first two appearances for the Brumbies off the bench in the 2003 semi-final against the Blues at Eden Park, and as a replacement in the 2004 championship winning side Lenny Beckett firstly established himself in the match-day 22 and then the starting XV in 2005.

While attending Westfields Sports High, Beckett played for the Australian Schoolboys rugby league team in 1997 and 1998.

Lenny has put in a series of solid performances that have seen him start the last 7 matches. Prior to his breakthrough season in 2005, Lenny had been a performer for the Brumby Runners and his club Sydney University. Before joining the Brumbies, Lenny played rugby league in the NRL for the Northern Eagles and Newcastle Knights and is a former Australian Schoolboys rugby league team representative.

== Player information ==
- Ht: 1.77m
- Wt: 88 kg
- DOB: 13 May 1980
- Position: Wing/Centre
- Club: Sydney University
- Brumbies (ACT) caps: 10 Points: 0
- Brumbies debut: 2003 v Blues, Auckland
- S12 Caps: 9 Points: 0
- S12 debut: 2003 v Blues, Auckland
