= John Beckett (RAF airman) =

- Born: 14 March 1906; Lurgan, County Armagh, Ireland
- Died: 12 April 1947 (aged 41); RAF Ein Shemer, Mandatory Palestine
- Burial place: Khayat Beach War Cemetery
- Military career
- Allegiance: United Kingdom
- Branch: Royal Air Force
- Service years: 1935–1947
- Rank: Sergeant
- Service number: 521319
- Conflicts: Second World War
- Awards: George Cross

John Archibald Beckett, GC (14 March 1906 – 12 April 1947) was a Royal Air Force airman and a recipient of the George Cross.

== Earlier years ==
John Beckett was born in Lurgan, County Armagh, Ireland, the son of Samuel Nicholl Beckett and Elizabeth Swanton Beckett. He was educated at St. Enoch's Public Elementary School, Belfast. Beckett worked as a fitter for the Coombe Barbour textiles company and at the Harland and Wolff shipyard.

== Royal Air Force ==
Beckett joined in the Royal Air Force in July 1935. In 1940 he was evacuated from France and he then served in Canada from March 1942 to March 1944. In 1944 his duties took him to Egypt, and then in 1946 to Palestine.

=== George Cross ===
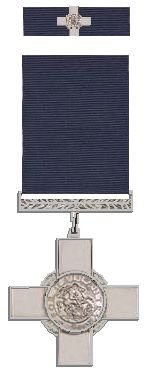
George Cross and its ribbon bar

On the night of 28 March 1947 at Ein Shemer Air Headquarters in the Levant, Sergeant Beckett was the driver of a refuelling vehicle which was refuelling a Lancaster of No. 38 Squadron. Suddenly, a violent fire broke out in the vehicle's pumping compartment; flames enveloped Sergeant Beckett and set alight the front of the Lancaster's fuselage. Another airman beat out the flames on Sergeant Beckett but not before the latter had sustained very severe burns on the hands and face.

There was a grave danger that the main tank of the refuelling vehicle would explode, killing or seriously injuring personnel who were working in the vicinity and destroying the twenty or more aircraft in the park. Mindful of this danger and in considerable pain, Beckett got into the driver's seat of the blazing vehicle and drove it a distance of about four hundred yards to a point where it could do no further damage.

At this point Beckett collapsed and he was taken by ambulance to the Station's Sick Quarters in a dangerously ill condition.

The fires in the Lancaster and in the vehicle were eventually brought under control and extinguished with no further damage to persons or property.

Beckett died of his injuries on 12 April 1947 and was posthumously awarded the George Cross.
