= James Drake (physician) =

English physician and political writer (1667–1707)

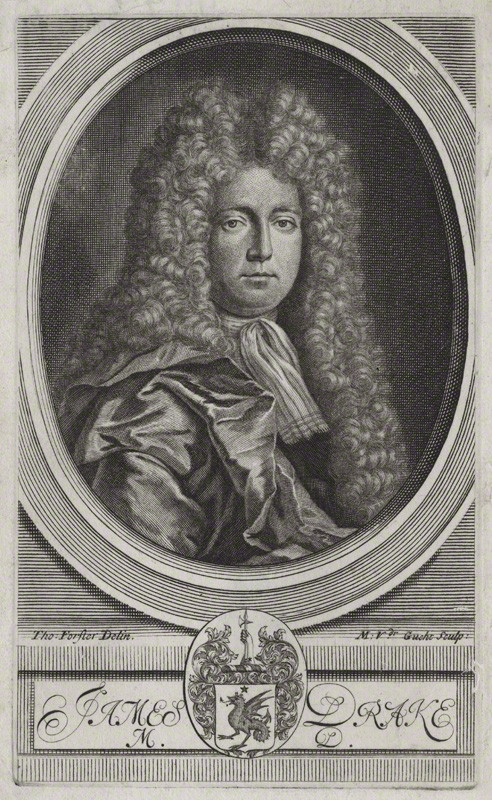
James Drake, 1707 engraving by Michael Vandergucht

James Drake (1667–1707) was an English physician and political writer, a Jacobite and Fellow of the Royal Society.

== Life ==
He was born in 1667 at Cambridge, where his father was a solicitor. He was educated at Wivelingham and Eton College, was admitted at Caius College, Cambridge, 20 March 1684, and graduated B.A. and M.A. In 1693 he went to London, and was encouraged in the study of medicine by Sir Thomas Millington. He became M.B. in 1690 and M.D. in 1694. In 1701 he was elected F.R.S., and was admitted fellow of the College of Physicians 30 June 1706.

Drake became disillusioned with his treatment at the hands of some of the Tories. He died of a fever, at Westminster, 2 March 1707.

== Works ==
In 1697 Drake had a share in a well-known pamphlet called Commendatory Verses upon the Author of Prince Arthur and King Arthur (Richard Blackmore).

=== Tory controversialist ===
Drake became known as a vigorous Tory pamphleteer. A New Test of Church of England's Loyalty (1702) by Daniel Defoe was answered by Drake as "A True Englishman" in Some Necessary Considerations, Relating to All Future Elections of Members to Serve in Parliament (1702).

In 1702 also Drake published The History of the Last Parliament, written in the Tory interest with the help of Anthony Hammond. It accused the Whigs of contemplating a new model of government and of traducing Queen Anne while she was a princess. The House of Lords had been investigating the report that William had plotted to secure the succession to the crown for the Elector of Hanover. Drake's pamphlet was noticed in the course of the debate. He confessed the authorship and was summoned before the House of Lords, which ordered him to be prosecuted. He was tried and acquitted.

In 1703 he published Historia Anglo-Scotica, allegedly from a manuscript by an unknown author. It was offensive to presbyterians and was burnt at the Mercat Cross in Edinburgh, 30 June 1703.

In 1704 he joined with Henry Poley, MP for Ipswich, in composing The Memorial of the Church of England, humbly offered to the consideration of all true lovers of our Church and Constitution; also involved was William Pittis. (In the past this anonymous work has been attributed to Pittis alone.) There was an answer, Occasional Thoughts (1705) on the Memorial, which is attributed to William Stephens. John Toland was paid to write another reply, Memorial of the State of England. Defoe answered, also, with The High Church Legion, or the Memorial Examined (1705).

This pamphlet gave offence to the Duke of Marlborough and Godolphin, who were beginning to separate themselves from the Tories. The book was also presented as a libel by the grand jury of London on 31 August 1705, and burnt by the common hangman. The Queen mentioned it in her speech to the new parliament (27 October 1705). After voting that the church was not in danger, both houses of parliament (14 December) requested the queen to punish persons responsible for scandalous insinuations to the contrary. A proclamation was issued offering reward for the discovery of the authors of the memorial. The printer made a statement implicating three members of the House of Commons, Poley, John Ward III, and Sir Humphry Mackworth, but stated that the pamphlet was brought to him by two women, one of them masked, and the printed copies delivered by him to porters, some of whom were arrested. No further discoveries, however, were made.

Drake escaped for the time, but was prosecuted the following spring for some passages in the Mercurius Politicus, a paper of which he was the author. John Hawles acted as his counsel, and a fellow physician John Radcliffe met some legal costs. He was convicted (14 February 1706) of a libel, but there had been a technical error and Drake was acquitted 6 November 1706. The government then brought a writ of error; but meanwhile Drake had died. In 1706 Drake had also edited an edition of Leicester's Commonwealth, with preface.

=== Medical works ===
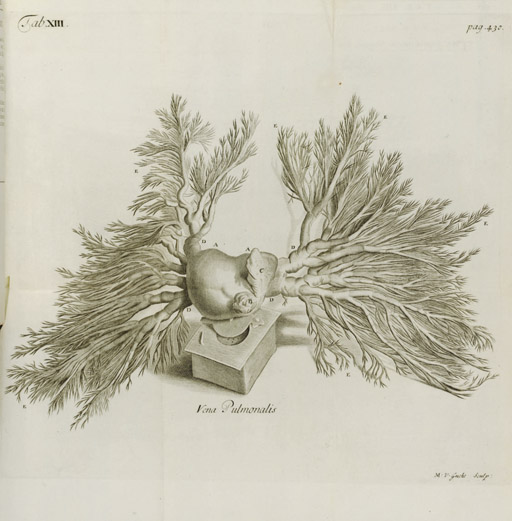
Veins of the lungs, illustration from Drake's Anthropologia Nova (1707)

A medical treatise called Anthropologia Nova, or a New System of Anatomy, was published just before Drake's death in 1707. In it he had the collaboration of William Cowper, for both text and plates. Contractually the book was a legacy of a project involving instead Clopton Havers, author of Osteologia nova (1691), who had died in 1702; and as a consequence used plates copied from Stephan Blancard. Drake's wife Judith edited the work and secured a dedication to Henry Somerset, 2nd Duke of Beaufort.

Anthropologia Nova reached a second edition in 1717, and a third in 1727. It was edited by William Wagstaffe, and was popular up to the publication of William Cheselden's Anatomy. Drake had in it a theory of acquired immunity to smallpox, which was then taken up by Clifton Wintringham.

Drake's Orationes Tres on medical subjects were printed in 1742, with a preface by Edward Milward. He contributed a paper concerning the influence of respiration on the action of the heart to the Philosophical Transactions.

=== Other works ===
Drake also wrote The Sham Lawyer, or the Lucky Extravagant (adapted from John Fletcher's Spanish Curate and Wit without Money), acted in 1697 and printed, according to the title-page, "as it was damnably acted at Drury Lane". He is also said to have written The Antient and Modern Stages Reviewed (1700), one of the replies to Jeremy Collier, and prefixed a life to the works of Tom Brown (1707).

== Family ==
His wife was Judith Drake, a medical practitioner as well as a writer. The baptism of a daughter Ann is recorded. There was also a son James, who gained the M.D. degree.
