= William Becket =

English surgeon and antiquary (1684–1738)

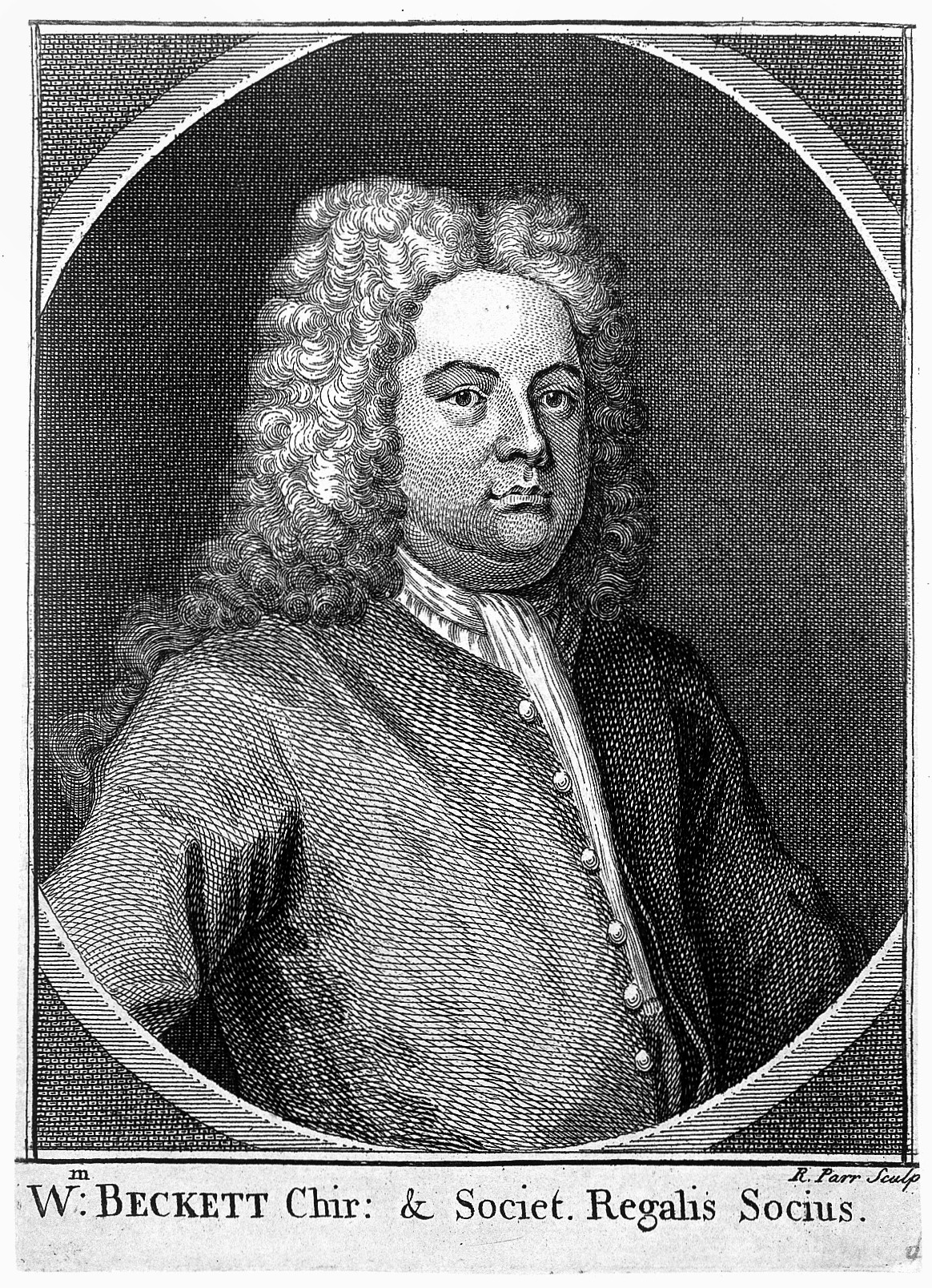
- Born: 1684
- Died: 1738 (aged 53–54)

William Becket (1684–1738) was an English surgeon and antiquary.

== Life ==
Becket was born at Abingdon, Berkshire. In the early years of the eighteenth century he was well known in London as a surgeon and an enthusiastic antiquary. He was elected a Fellow of the Royal Society on 11 December 1718, and read three papers on The Antiquity of the Venereal Disease at its meetings during the same year (Philosophical Transactions. vi. 368, 467, 492), and one on another subject in 1724 (Philosophical Transactions vii. 25).

Becket was an original member of the Society of Antiquaries, which was effectively established in 1717, and was on close terms with William Stukeley, William Bowyer, Browne Willis, and other antiquaries. He was for some years surgeon to St. Thomas's Hospital, Southwark, but before 1736 he had retired to Abingdon, where he died 25 November 1738. Stukeley noted in his common-place book that Becket's papers were bought by Edmund Curll, who sold them to Edward Milward.

== Works ==
1. New Discoveries relating to the Cure of Cancers, 1711 and 1712.
2. An Enquiry into the Antiquity and Efficacy of Touching for the King's Evil, with a Collection of Records, 1722. John Anstis the elder gave Becket some assistance in this work.
3. Practical Surgery, illustrated and improved, with remarks on the most remarkable Cases, Cures, and Discussions in St. Thomas's Hospital, 1740.
4. A Collection of Chirurgical Tracts, 1740.
