= Billy Beckett =

English footballer

Personal information
- Full name: William J. Beckett
- Date of birth: 4 July 1915
- Place of birth: Kirkdale, Merseyside, England
- Date of death: 5 April 1999 (aged 83)
- Place of death: Ormskirk, Lancs, England
- Height: 5 ft 6 in (1.68 m)
- Positions: Outside left; inside left

Senior career*
Years	Team	Apps	(Gls)
- Litherland
1934–1935	New Brighton Tower	25	(4)
1936	Tranmere Rovers	0	(0)
- South Liverpool
1937	Blackpool	0	(0)
1938–1945	Bradford City	5	(1)
1945–1946	Watford	7	(1)
1947	Northampton Town	0	(0)
- * Club domestic league appearances and goals

William J. Beckett (4 July 1915 – 5 April 1999) was an English footballer. He played for eight clubs in a circa fifteen-year career, six of which were during World War II.

He made five appearances in the Football League for Bradford City.

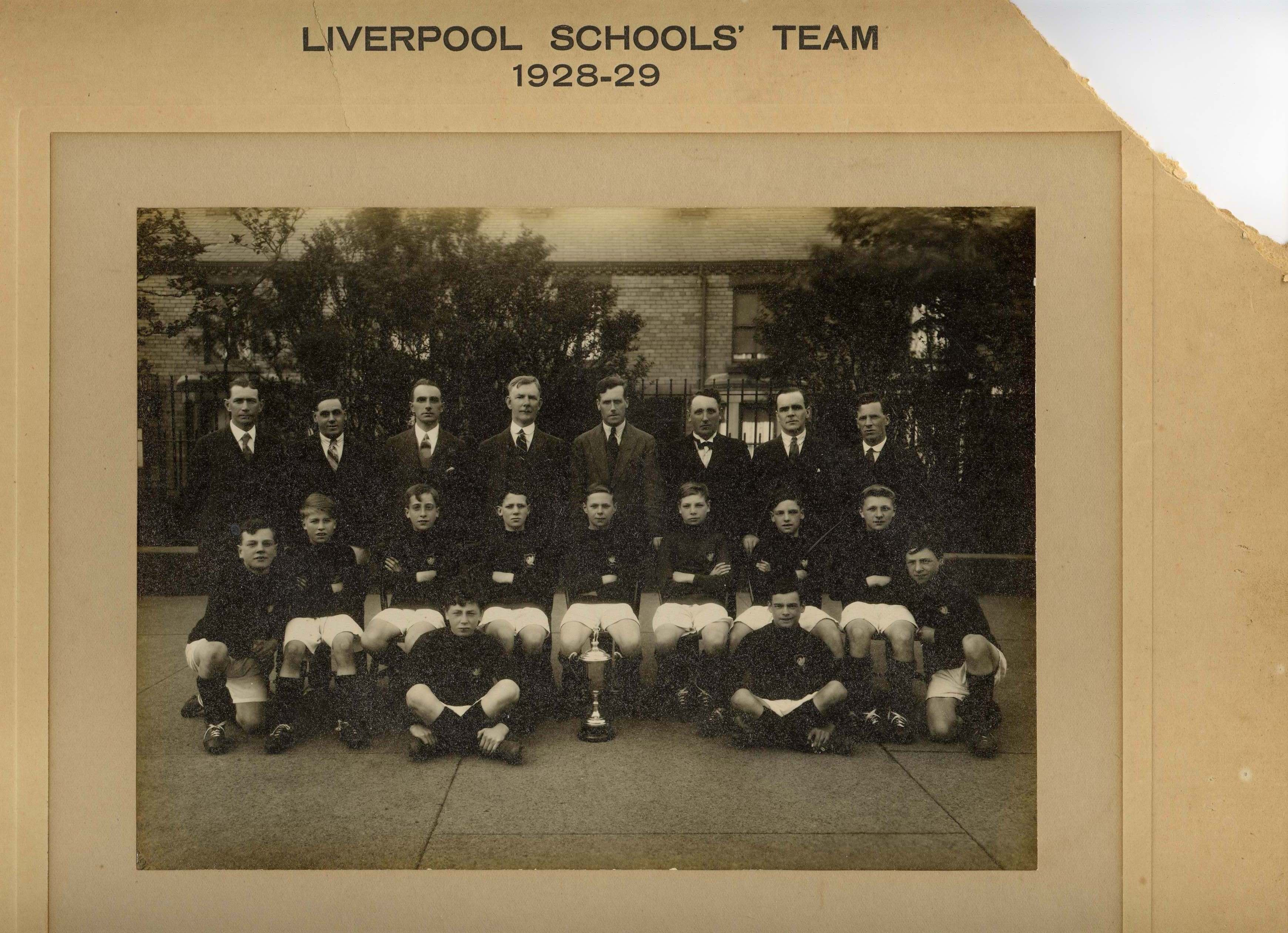
