= Robbie Beckett (rugby league) =

Australian rugby league footballer

Personal information
- Full name: Robbie Beckett
- Born: 14 August 1972 (age 53) Camperdown, New South Wales, Australia

Playing information
- Position: Wing
Club
Years	Team	Pld	T	G	FG	P
1994–01	Penrith Panthers	146	66	0	0	264
2002	Halifax Blue Sox	30	17	0	0	68
2003	Wests Tigers	4	1	0	0	4
	Total	180	84	0	0	336
Representative
Years	Team	Pld	T	G	FG	P
1995–96	NSW City	2	0	0	0	0
- Source: As of 15 January 2019
- Relatives: Lenny Beckett (brother)

Robbie Beckett (born 14 August 1972) is an Australian former professional rugby league footballer who played in the 1990s and 2000s. He played at club level for the Penrith Panthers, the Wests Tigers and Halifax Blue Sox. Beckett represented Australia at the 1996 Super League World Nines. Beckett is the older brother of the rugby league and rugby union footballer; Lenny Beckett.

== Playing career ==
Beckett made his debut for Penrith against Balmain in Round 6 1994. In 1995 and 1996, Beckett was selected to play for NSW City.

In 1997, Beckett only played in 9 games during the club's season in the Super League but played in both of Penrith's finals games against Canterbury and Canberra scoring a try in both matches.

Beckett's best try scoring season was in 1998 when he scored 12 tries in 24 games.

Beckett played finals football again with Penrith when they finished 5th in 2000. Beckett played in both finals games scoring a try in the 28-10 elimination finals loss to Parramatta. In 2001, Beckett made 21 appearances as Penrith finished last on the table claiming the wooden spoon. Beckett's last game for Penrith in first grade was a 60-18 loss against eventual premiers Newcastle.

In 2002, Beckett joined English side Halifax Blue Sox and played one season with the club before returning to Australia. Beckett finished his career with the Wests Tigers in 2003.
