= Beckett (disambiguation) =

Beckett is a surname.

Beckett may also refer to:

== Places ==
- Beckett, New Jersey, United States, a census-designated place and unincorporated community
- Beckett, Ohio, United States, an unincorporated community
- Beckett, Oklahoma, United States, an unincorporated community
- Beckett (crater), a crater on Mercury
- Beckett Hall or Beckett House, a 19th-century mansion in Oxfordshire, England
- Beckett Nunatak, Victoria Land, Antarctica, a rock nunatak
- Beckett Park, a residential area and park in Leeds, West Yorkshire, England
- Beckett Point, Washington, United States, a small point

== Businesses ==
- Beckett Media, an American company focusing on collectibles, especially sports collectibles

== Other uses ==
- Beckett baronets, two extant titles in the Baronetage of the United Kingdom
- Beckett Bould (1880–1970), British actor
- Beckett (horse), an Irish Thoroughbred racehorse
- Beckett (band), an English hard rock band
- Beckett (film), a 2021 thriller film
- Beckett Mariner, a character in the Star Trek animated series Lower Decks

== See also ==
- Becket (disambiguation)
