= Robbie Beckett =

American baseball player (born 1972)

- Pitcher
- Born: July 16, 1972 (age 54); Austin, Texas, U.S.
- Batted: Right Threw: Left

MLB debut
- September 12, 1996, for the Colorado Rockies

Last MLB appearance
- September 26, 1997, for the Colorado Rockies

MLB statistics
- Win–loss record: 0–0
- Earned run average: 11.57
- Strikeouts: 8
- Stats at Baseball Reference

Teams
- Colorado Rockies (1996–1997)

Robbie Beckett (born July 16, 1972) is an American former Major League Baseball pitcher.

== Career ==
In 1990, he was drafted in the first round (25th) by the San Diego Padres in the amateur draft out of McCallum High School in Austin, Texas. Starting out for the Rancho Cucamonga Quakes in the Padre's farm system, he was soon well known for his impressive 100 mph fastballs at the young age of 21. During one stretch of his stint at the Quakes, he was able to throw 88 strikeouts in 84 innings. However, Beckett's extreme fastballs were counterbalanced by his poor control. During one spring training session, veteran MLB hitters refused to go to bat against such a powerful and erratic pitch and risk injury so early in the season. Unable to make progress in the Padres farm system, the team waived Beckett on March 29, 1996. The Florida Marlins picked Beckett up but soon waived him also. After Florida, the Colorado Rockies selected Beckett off waivers. Beckett made his Major League debut with the Rockies on September 12, 1996, when he was 24 years old. Beckett was a left-handed pitcher, but batted with his right. Beckett only played in seven games (none of which he started), and was released from the Colorado Rockies on September 26, 1997.
