= Edward a'Beckett (cricketer, born 1940) =

Australian cricketer (1940–2011)

Personal information
- Born: 18 January 1940; Melbourne, Australia
- Died: 27 May 2011 (aged 71); Lismore, Victoria, Australia

Domestic team information
- Years: Team
- 1966: Victoria
- Source: Cricinfo, 5 December 2015

Edward a'Beckett (18 January 1940 – 27 May 2011) was an Australian cricketer. He played one first-class cricket matches for Victoria in 1966.

== See also ==
- List of Victoria first-class cricketers
