= Richard Beckett (author) =

Australian author and journalist

Richard Beckett (1936 – 1987) was an Australian author and journalist.

Beckett was a founding staffer (Assistant Editor) of Nation Review, an irreverent and ground-breaking Sunday newspaper, nicknamed 'The Ferret', launched in 1970 by Gordon Barton. Beckett was its irascible and entertaining food columnist for eight years, using the pseudonym Sam Orr. He wrote several books on food and wine, alternative life-style, and Australian history.

Beckett left his home in Molong, New South Wales, in early 1987, moving to Daylesford, Victoria. Single again and in poor health, he initially stayed at the Royal Hotel. Daylesford friends, concerned about his welfare, arranged for him to rent a miner's cottage high on Wombat Hill, near the Convent Gallery, where he lived for eight months. His trusted typewriter, usually with a wine glass on one side and a range of reference books on the other, remained in action as he wrote articles for The Age, Australian "Epicure", and other publications. Beckett's great friend John Hepworth kept in constant touch.

When friends visited, Beckett took the opportunity to dine out, a meal at "Lake House" being particularly memorable. He became particularly fond of his neighbours' grey cat, Orson - indeed, a piece about Orson was one of Beckett's final articles for The Age. He described enjoying a walk in the snow in the Wombat Hill Gardens not long before he collapsed and died, alone, in August 1987. He was cremated at Fawkner Cemetery. Friends, including Dinny O'Hearn, John Hepworth, John Hindle and Brendan Giffney, met at a favourite Carlton hotel, "Stewarts", to remember his life. His obituary, "The Press Loses A Fiery Spirit", written by his friend Kevin Childs, was published in The Age. In late 1987, a small group of friends, led by John Hepworth, farewelled Beckett on a thundery day in Melbourne when, according to his wishes, his ashes were strewn in the Yarra River.

== Bibliography ==
- See Ferretabilia: the life and times of Nation Review by Richard Walsh (St. Lucia: UQP, 1993 ISBN 0-7022-2450-2) for more about Nation Review and—inter alia— Beckett himself.

A partial and sketchy bibliography, obtained from the National Library of Australia catalogue:

- Gourmet's garden (1975), Sam Orr
- Commonsense gardening guide (1976), Richard Beckett
- Guide to Australian gemstones (1976), Richard Beckett and Oliver Chalmers, Reader's Digest, Sydney 1976 ISBN 0-949819-38-7.
- What wine is that? the unique Australian wine guide by label identification (1977)
- Sydney restaurant guide (1977), Sam Orr
- Walks around Sydney (1978), Richard Beckett
- Guide to Australian wine (1978), Richard Beckett
- Sydney restaurant guide (1979), Sam Orr
- Richard Beckett alias Sam Orr talks about food (1979), illustrated by Robert Pearce
- Bulletin book of Australian wineries (1979), Richard Beckett & Donald Hogg
- Hungry eye, Sydney restaurant guide (1980), Sam Orr; cartoons by Patrick Cook
- Surviving in the eighties (1980), Michael Boddy and Richard Beckett; illustrated by Janet Dawson Boddy
- Roll on brave new bloody world (1980), text by Sam Orr; cartoons by Michael Leunig
  - The introduction to this book explains the origin of Sam Orr; many of its articles are mildly autobiographical.
- Hangman – The Life and Times of Alexander Green, Public Executioner to the Colony of New South Wales, Ray Beckett and Richard Beckett, Thomas Nelson Australia, Melbourne, 1980 ISBN 0-17-005261-3
- Home grown: survive the recession from your own backyard (1983), Richard Beckett; illustrations by Dianne Bradley
- Convicted tastes: food in Australia, (1984) Richard Beckett
- Complete guide to Australian food, (1984), Sam Orr; with cover illustrations by Michael Leunig
- Dinkum Aussie dictionary (1986), by Crooked Mick of the Speewa; illustrated by Brendan Akhurst ISBN 0-86777-154-2
- Country grown (1987), Richard Beckett; illustrations by Richard Gray
- Dinkum Queensland dictionary (1988), Crooked Mick of the Speewa; illustrated by Brendan Akhurst
- Axemen, stand by your logs! (1988), Richard Beckett
- New dinkum Aussie dictionary (2000), Crooked Mick of the Speewa, illustrated by Brendan Akhurst ISBN 978-1-86436-645-7
