= Ray Beckett (journalist) =

Australian journalist, newspaper editor and author

Raymond Harry Beckett (1903–1983) was an Australian journalist, newspaper editor and author.

Before becoming a journalist he worked as a rouseabout in South Australia. His first position as a journalist was working for the Adelaide Advertiser where he was paid one penny per line of copy. Other positions he has held include: chief sub-editor at the Sydney Telegraph, Assistant Editor of the Sunday Telegraph and the Sun-Herald and editor of the Sunday Mirror.

== Bibliography ==
- Beckett, Ray; Richard Beckett (1980). Hangman: the life and times of Alexander Green, public executioner to the colony of New South Wales. West Melbourne, Victoria: Nelson. ISBN 0-17-005261-3. OCLC 224378111.
