= Alex Beckett (footballer) =

Scottish footballer

Alexander Michael Beckett (born 19 February 1954) is a Scottish former footballer who played as a defender.

Beckett is best known for his time with St. Mirren, where he made 195 league appearances for the Paisley side. He also played for Falkirk and Queen of the South.

Beckett was inducted into the St. Mirren F.C. Hall of Fame in 2008.
