= J. C. Beckett =

Northern Irish historian (1912–1996)

- Born: James Camlin Beckett; 8 February 1912; Belfast
- Died: 12 February 1996 (aged 84); Belfast

Academic background
- Education: Queen's University Belfast

Academic work
- Discipline: History
- Institutions: Belfast Royal Academy; Queen's University Belfast
- Main interests: Irish history

James Camlin Beckett (8 February 1912 – 12 February 1996) was a Northern Irish historian.

== Early life ==
Beckett was a native of Belfast, where he received his education at the Royal Belfast Academical Institution (where he was a contemporary of R. B. McDowell) and Queen's University. He initially read English literature before transferring to Modern History and in 1934 he graduated with First Class Honours.

== Academic career ==
After his graduation he taught at Belfast Royal Academy and completed an MA degree under the supervision of T. W. Moody. His MA dissertation was published by Faber under the title Protestant Dissent in Ireland 1687–1780 and was the second volume in the 'Studies in Irish History' series, of which Moody was co-editor. In 1945 he joined the history faculty of Queen's University, where he was to spend the majority of his career. Initially a lecturer, he received promotion to a readership in 1952. During 1955–56 he was a Fellow Commoner at Peterhouse, Cambridge. In 1958 Queen's University awarded him a personal chair in Irish history, which he held until he retired in 1975 and assumed emeritus status.

Beckett was also the Cummings Lecturer at McGill University in 1976 and the Mellon Professor at Tulane University in 1977. He was awarded an honorary degree of Doctor of Literature by the University of Ulster, the National University of Ireland and Queen's University. Beckett served on the Royal Commission on Historical Documents from 1960 until 1986.

The Making of Modern Ireland, published in 1966, is considered his master-work and it became a standard textbook in schools and colleges. The book was groundbreaking in that it presented the findings of a critical generation of Irish historians and was, according to David Quinn, "not only learned but cool, objective, unimpassioned and yet always alive and compassionate as well".

He was a member of the Church of Ireland.

== Works ==
- Protestant Dissent in Ireland, 1687–1780 (1948).
- A Short History of Ireland (1952).
- Ulster since 1800: A Political and Economic Survey (1954).
- Ulster since 1800: A Social Survey (1957).
- Queen's, Belfast 1845–1949: The History of a University (with T. W. Moody, 1959).
- The Making of Modern Ireland (1966).
- Belfast: Origins and Growth of an Industrial City (1967).
- The Ulster Debate: Report of a Study Group of the Institute for the Study of Conflict (1972), with Brian Crozier and Robert Moss. London: The Bodley Head for the Institute for the Study of Conflict. ISBN 978-0370103891.
- The Anglo-Irish Tradition (1976)
- The Cavalier Duke: A Life of James Butler, 1st Duke of Ormond, 1610–1688 (1990).
