= Edward a'Beckett (cricketer, born 1836) =

Australian cricketer

Personal information
- Born: 16 April 1836; Holborn, London, England
- Died: 25 March 1922 (aged 85); Beaconsfield Upper, Victoria, Australia

Domestic team information
- Years: Team
- 1852-1857: Victoria
- Source: Cricinfo, 30 January 2015

Edward a'Beckett (16 April 1836 – 25 March 1922) was an Australian cricketer. He played two first-class cricket matches for Victoria.

== See also ==
- List of Victoria first-class cricketers
