= Charles Beckett (cricketer) =

English cricketer

Charles Andrew Beckett (7 February 1794 – 1838) was an English cricketer associated with Marylebone Cricket Club who was active in the 1810s. He is recorded in two matches, totalling 19 runs with a highest score of 13. He held one catch and took 8 wickets including one return of 4 wickets in an innings.

== Bibliography ==
- Haygarth, Arthur (1996) [1862]. Scores & Biographies, Volume 1 (1744–1826). Kennington: Frederick Lillywhite. ISBN 978-19-00592-23-9.
- Haygarth, Arthur (1997) [1862]. Scores & Biographies, Volume 2 (1827–1840). Kennington: Frederick Lillywhite. ISBN 978-19-00592-23-9.
