= Ted à Beckett =

Australian cricketer

Ted a'Beckett
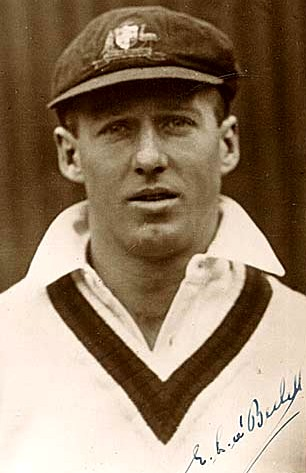

Personal information
- Full name: Edward Lambert a'Beckett
- Born: 11 August 1907; St Kilda East, Victoria, Australia
- Died: 2 June 1989 (aged 81); Terang, Victoria, Australia
- Nickname: Ted
- Height: 6 ft 0 in (1.83 m)
- Batting: Right-handed
- Bowling: Right-arm fast-medium

International information
- National side: Australia
- Test debut (cap 128): 29 December 1928 v England
- Last Test: 6 January 1932 v South Africa

Domestic team information
- Years: Team
- 1927–1932: Victoria

Career statistics
Competition	Test	First-class
Matches	4	47
Runs scored	143	1,636
Batting average	20.42	29.21
100s/50s	0/0	2/7
Top score	41	152
Balls bowled	1,062	9,196
Wickets	3	105
Bowling average	105.66	29.16
5 wickets in innings	0	3
10 wickets in match	0	0
Best bowling	1/41	6/119
Catches/stumpings	4/–	35/–
- Source: Cricinfo, 2 October 2009

Edward Lambert à Beckett (11 August 1907 – 2 June 1989) was an Australian cricketer who played in four Test matches between 1928 and 1931. He played in 47 first-class matches for Victoria.

À Beckett was the second of three sons born to solicitor Thomas Archibald à Beckett and his wife Ada Mary à Beckett, née Lambert. His grandfather was the judge Sir Thomas à Beckett. He studied law at the University of Melbourne, entering Trinity College in 1927, where he excelled at sports, and represented the university in both cricket and Australian rules football before being seriously injured, fracturing his skull.

A solicitor by profession, after his retirement a'Beckett was involved in the administration of the Victorian Cricket Association.

== Sources ==
- Piesse, K. & Davis, C. (2012) Encyclopedia of Australian Cricket Players, New Holland Publishers: Sydney. ISBN 9781742572802.
