= TC/2.4 mine =

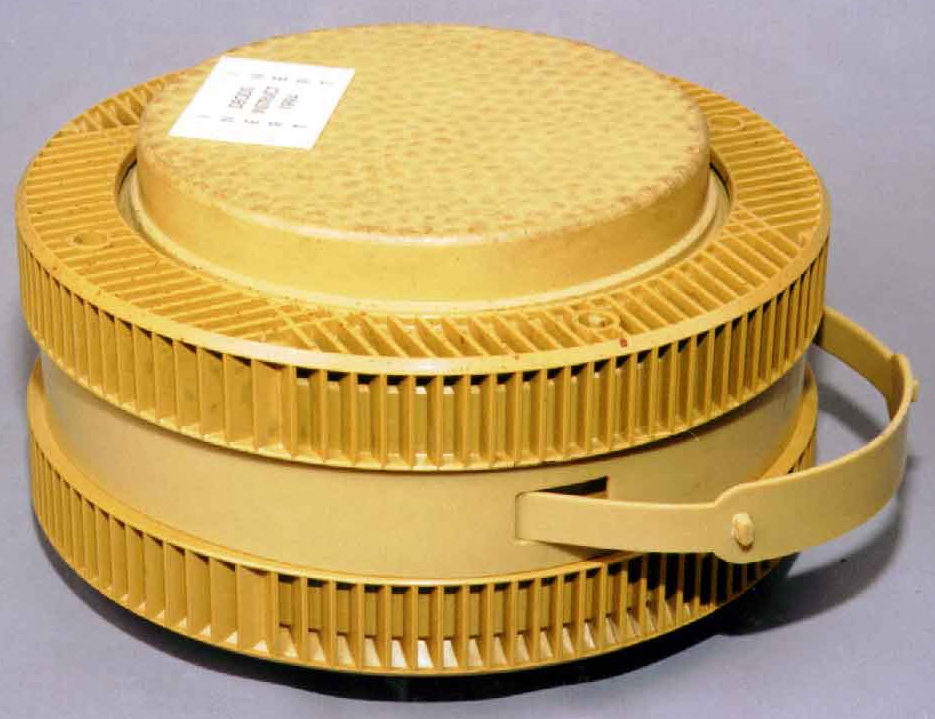
A TC/2.4 landmine.

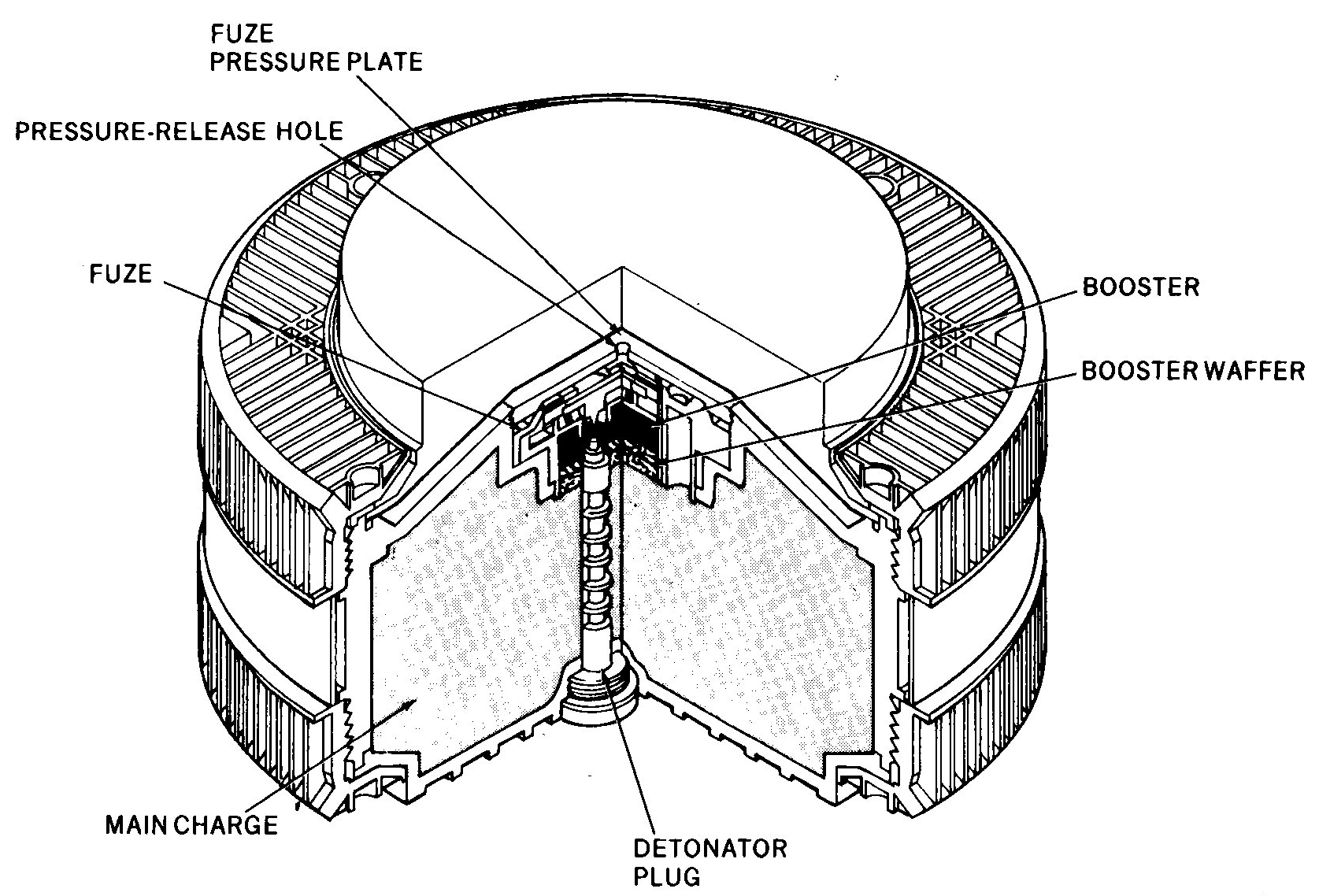
A cutaway of the mine.

The TC/2.4 is a circular plastic cased Italian minimum metal anti-tank blast mine. The mine uses a blast and shock resistant pneumatic fuze. It could be laid by hand or mechanically, and could be fitted with anti-handling devices. An Egyptian copy of the mine is produced, designated as the M/80. The mine was used in Iraq, but is no longer produced.

== Specifications ==
- Diameter: 204 mm
- Height: 108 mm
- Weight: 3.3 kg
- Explosive content: 2.4 kg of Composition B
- Operating pressure: 180 to 300 kg

This image is a picture of a M80 mine a copy of the TC 2.4, note the smooth surface of the pressure plate, a TC 2.4 mine (as per Janes Manual 06/07) has a grid indented on the surface and is not smooth. UK MITC
