= Fuze =

Device which initiates munition explosion

In military munitions, a fuze (sometimes spelled fuse) is the part of the device that initiates its function. In some applications, such as torpedoes, a fuze may be identified by function as the exploder. The relative complexity of even the earliest fuze designs can be seen in cutaway diagrams.

A fuze is a device that detonates a munition's explosive material under specified conditions. In addition, a fuze will have safety and arming mechanisms that protect users from premature or accidental detonation. For example, an artillery fuze's battery is activated by the high acceleration of cannon launch, and the fuze must be spinning rapidly before it will function. "Complete bore safety" can be achieved with mechanical shutters that isolate the detonator from the main charge until the shell is fired.

A fuze may contain only the electronic or mechanical elements necessary to signal or actuate the detonator, but some fuzes contain a small amount of primary explosive to initiate the detonation. Fuzes for large explosive charges may include an explosive booster.

== Name ==
The word derives from Italian fuso, itself derived form Latin fūsus, spindle, applied to the spindle-shaped tube originally used to detonate a bomb. "Fuse" is attested from 1647.

Some professional publications about explosives and munitions distinguish the "fuse" and "fuze" spellings. Where a distinction is made usages are:

Fuse: Cord or tube for the transmission of flame or explosion usually consisting of cord or rope with gunpowder or high explosive spun into it. (The spelling fuze may also be met for this term, but fuse is the preferred spelling in this context.)
Fuze: A device with explosive components designed to initiate a main charge. (The spelling fuse may also be met for this term, but fuze is the preferred spelling in this context.)

Historically, it was spelled with either 's' or 'z', and both spellings can still be found.

== Munition types ==
The situation of usage and the characteristics of the munition it is intended to activate affect the fuze design e.g. its safety and actuation mechanisms.

Artillery
Artillery fuzes are tailored to function in the special circumstances of artillery projectiles. The relevant factors are the projectile's initial rapid acceleration, high velocity and usually rapid rotation, which affect both safety and arming requirements and options, and the target may be moving or stationary. Artillery fuzes may be initiated by a timer mechanism, impact or detection of proximity to the target, or a combination of these.
Grenades
Requirements for a grenade fuze are defined by the projectile's small size and slow delivery over a short distance. This necessitates manual arming before throwing as the grenade has insufficient initial acceleration for arming to be driven by "setback" and no rotation to drive arming by centrifugal force.
Aerial bombs
Aerial bombs can be detonated either by a fuze, which contains a small explosive charge to initiate the main charge, or by a "pistol", a firing pin in a case which strikes the detonator when triggered. The pistol may be considered a part of the mechanical fuze assembly.
Landmines
The main design consideration is that the bomb that the fuze is intended to actuate is stationary, and the target itself is moving in making contact.
Naval mines
Relevant design factors in naval mine fuzes are that the mine may be static or moving downward through the water, and the target is typically moving on or below the water surface, usually above the mine.

== Activation mechanisms ==
=== Time ===
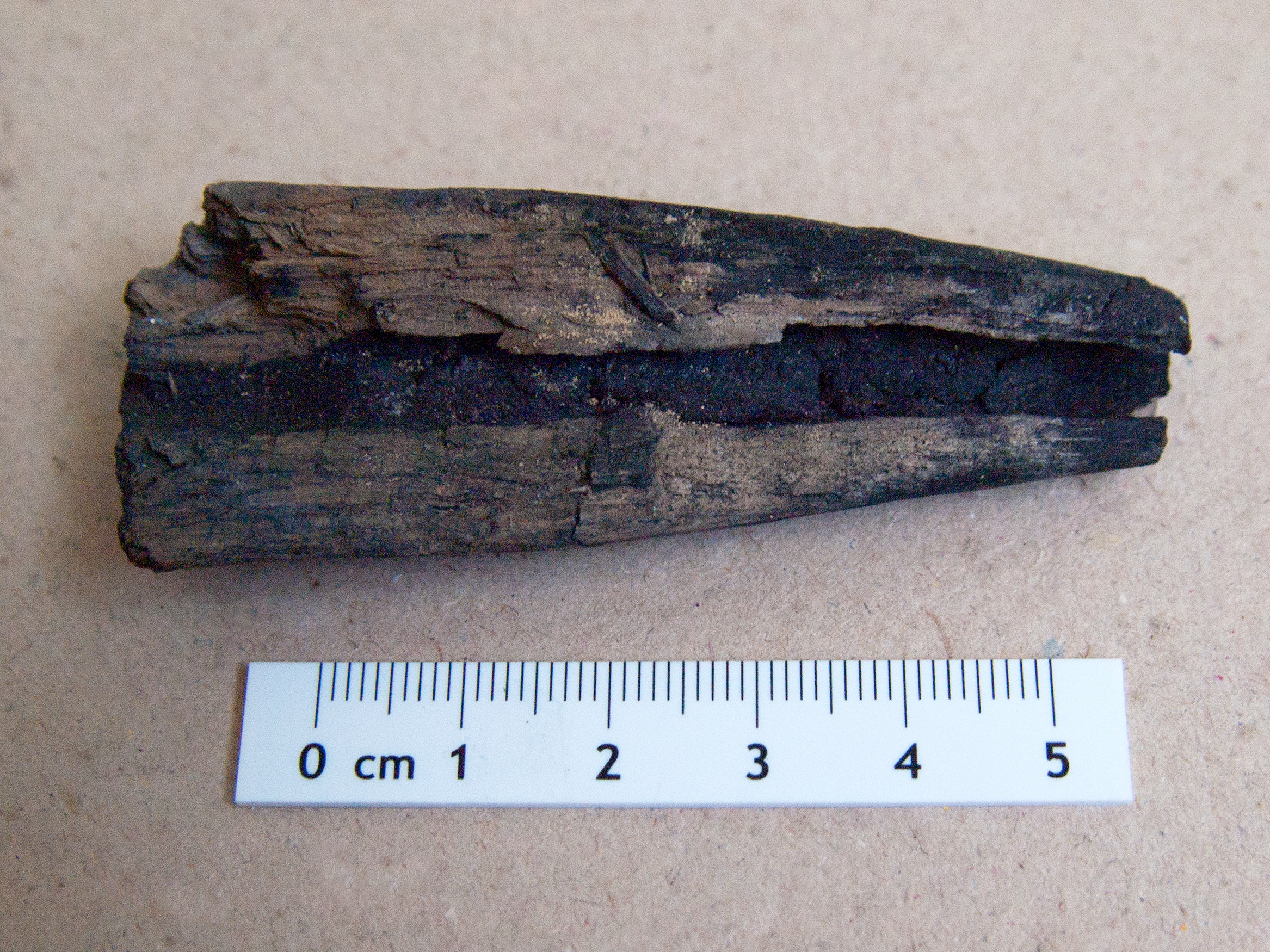
Wooden grenade fuse from the 17th Century, broken open vertically, with preserved delay charge.

Time fuzes detonate after a set period of time by using one or more combinations of mechanical, electronic, pyrotechnic or even chemical timers. Depending on the technology used, the device may self-destruct (or render itself safe without detonation) some seconds, minutes, hours, days, or even months after being deployed.

Early artillery time fuzes were nothing more than a hole filled with gunpowder leading from the surface to the centre of the projectile. The flame from the burning of the gunpowder propellant ignited this "fuze" on firing, and burned through to the centre during flight, then igniting or exploding whatever the projectile may have been filled with.

By the 19th century devices more recognisable as modern artillery "fuzes" were being made of carefully selected wood and trimmed to burn for a predictable time after firing. These were still typically fired from smoothbore muzzle-loaders with a relatively large gap between the shell and barrel, and still relied on flame from the gunpowder propellant charge escaping past the shell on firing to ignite the wood fuze and hence initiate the timer.

In the mid-to-late 19th century adjustable metal time fuzes, the fore-runners of today's time fuzes, containing burning gunpowder as the delay mechanism became common, in conjunction with the introduction of rifled artillery. Rifled guns introduced a tight fit between shell and barrel and hence could no longer rely on the flame from the propellant to initiate the timer. The new metal fuzes typically use the shock of firing ("setback") and/or the projectiles's rotation to "arm" the fuze and initiate the timer : hence introducing a safety factor previously absent.

As late as World War I, some countries were still using hand-grenades with simple black match fuses much like those of modern fireworks: the infantryman lit the fuse before throwing the grenade and hoped the fuse burned for the several seconds intended. These were soon superseded in 1915 by the Mills bomb, the first modern hand grenade with a relatively safe and reliable time fuze initiated by pulling out a safety pin and releasing an arming handle on throwing.

Modern time fuzes often use an electronic delay system.

=== Impact ===
Impact, percussion or contact fuzes detonate when their forward motion rapidly decreases, typically on physically striking an object such as the target. The detonation may be instantaneous or deliberately delayed to occur a preset fraction of a second after penetration of the target. An instantaneous "superquick" fuze will detonate nearly instantly on the slightest physical contact with the target. A fuze with a graze action will also detonate on change of direction caused by a slight glancing blow on a physical obstruction, such as the ground.

Impact fuzes in artillery usage may be mounted in the shell nose ("point detonating") or shell base ("base detonating").

=== Inertia ===
Inertial fuzes are triggered when the entity carrying them (for example, a torpedo, air-dropped bomb, sea mine, or booby trap) experiences a sudden (or gradual, depending on the design) acceleration, deceleration, or impact. In this way they are both similar to and different from impact fuzes. Whereas impact fuzes usually require physical contact with, or an impact against a hard surface, inertial fuzes can trigger from any change of momentum. This allows them to be mounted deep inside the entity carrying them, rather than on its exterior. Designs can be varied. Some can be passively safe, ignoring all changes of momentum below a certain threshold, thereby functioning similarly to impact fuzes without the limitation of being externally mounted. Other designs can be passively dangerous, using other energy sources such as gravity or an electrical battery to greatly amplify slight changes in inertia over time. One easy way of visualizing a passively safe inertial fuze is to picture a marble in a bowl - the device is triggered when the marble rolls to the rim of the bowl. In contrast, a passively dangerous inertial fuze would be similar to a marble on a smooth, flat plate. The former uses gravity to actively suppress weak forces acting on the marble, whereas the latter uses gravity to actively amplify them. Passively dangerous inertial fuzes are commonly employed in anti-handling devices.

For comparatively low-velocity munitions such as torpedoes, inertial fuzes of the pendulum and swing-arm types have been used historically. An early example of a pendulum fuze can be seen in the design of the Brennan torpedo. Inertial fuzing is also used in the design of HESH munitions, since their concept precludes the use of contact fuzing.

=== Proximity ===
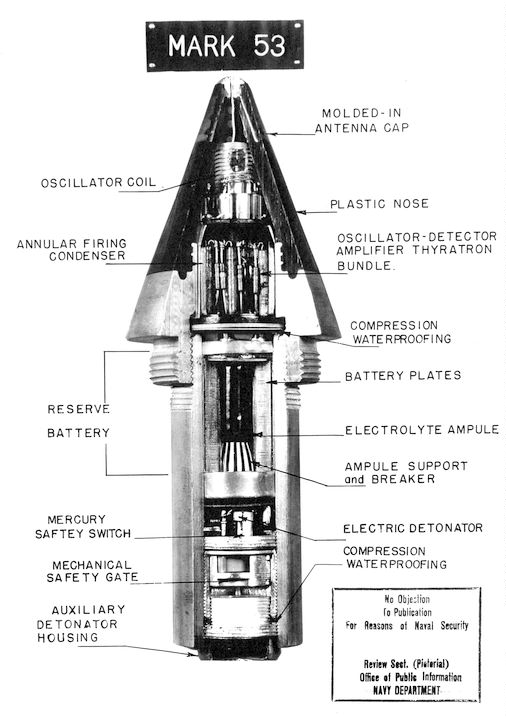
Mk 53 Proximity fuze for an artillery shell, c. 1945

Proximity fuzes cause a missile warhead or other munition (e.g. air-dropped bomb, sea mine, or torpedo) to detonate when it comes within a certain pre-set distance of the target, or vice versa. Proximity fuzes utilize sensors incorporating one or more combinations of the following: radar, active sonar, passive acoustic, infrared, magnetic, photoelectric, seismic or even television cameras. These may take the form of an anti-handling device designed specifically to kill or severely injure anyone who tampers with the munition in some way e.g. lifting or tilting it. Regardless of the sensor used, the pre-set triggering distance is calculated such that the explosion will occur sufficiently close to the target that it is either destroyed or severely damaged.

=== Remote detonation ===
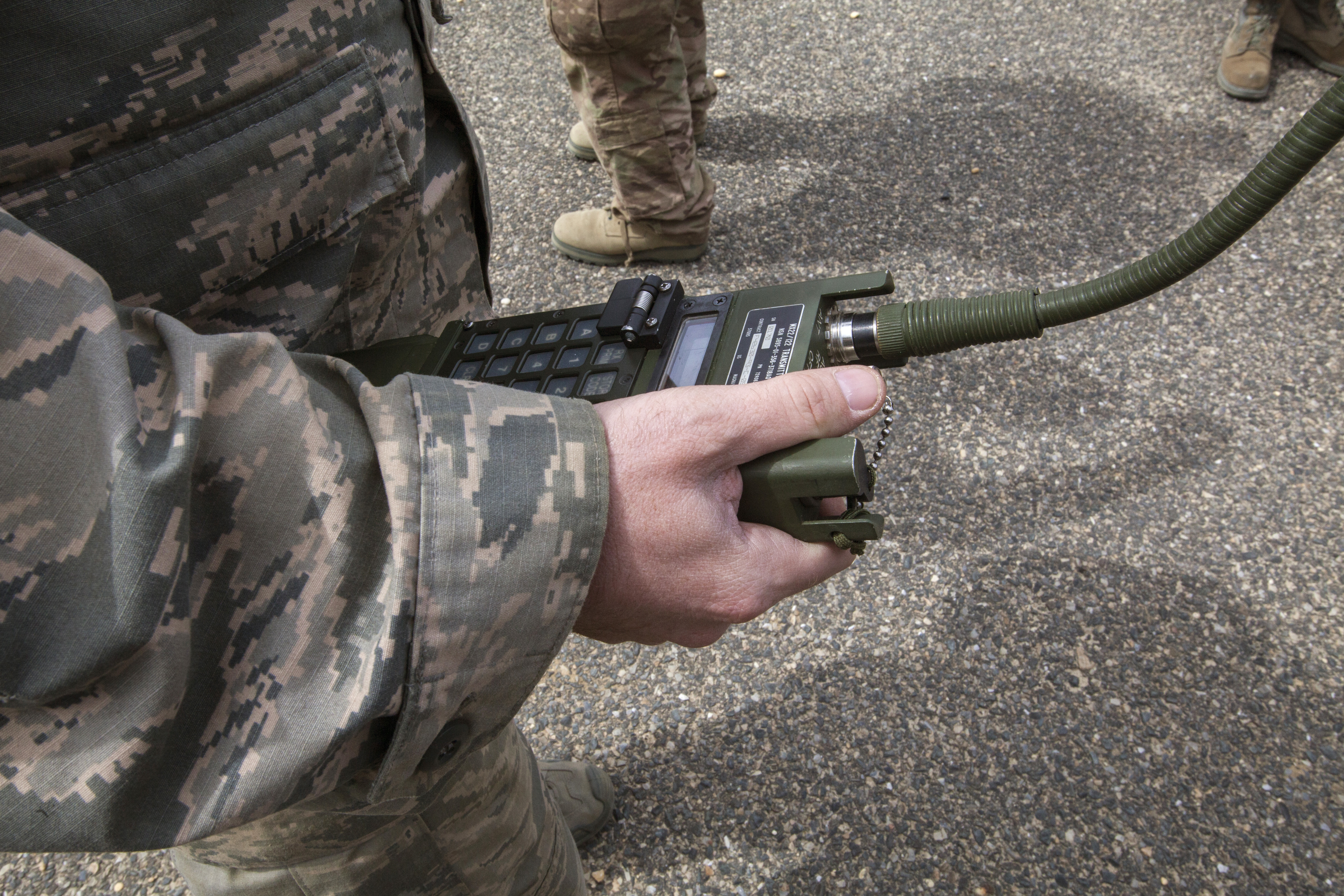
A modern multichannel radio remote detonator, in 2015.

Detonation can be triggered from distant sources of interaction. This can be accomplished both by mechanical and electronic means. Electronic or electrical remote detonators use wires or electromagnetic radiation (such as radio waves or infrared light) to remotely command the device to detonate. This can be achieved by either a deliberate command from a transmitter apparatus, or by autonomous transmission of a signal, or sensing of an interruption of a continuous signal. A simple example of an electrical wired remote detonator is known as a blasting machine, a device used since the 19th century. Vast and sophisticated systems like Dead Hand could also technically fall within this category.

Mechanical remote detonators use some type of mechanical linkage, usually a lanyard or tripwire, but sophisticated rigid linkages are also a possibility. Lanyards have been commonly employed by artillery pull primers. Lanyards continue to be used to trigger primer detonations in modern emplaced artillery, for safety reasons. Such devices are no longer of the friction primer type, using modern impact or electronic primer ignition systems.

=== Barometric ===
Barometric fuzes cause a bomb to detonate at a certain pre-set altitude above sea level by means of a radar, barometric altimeter or an infrared rangefinder.

=== Combinations ===
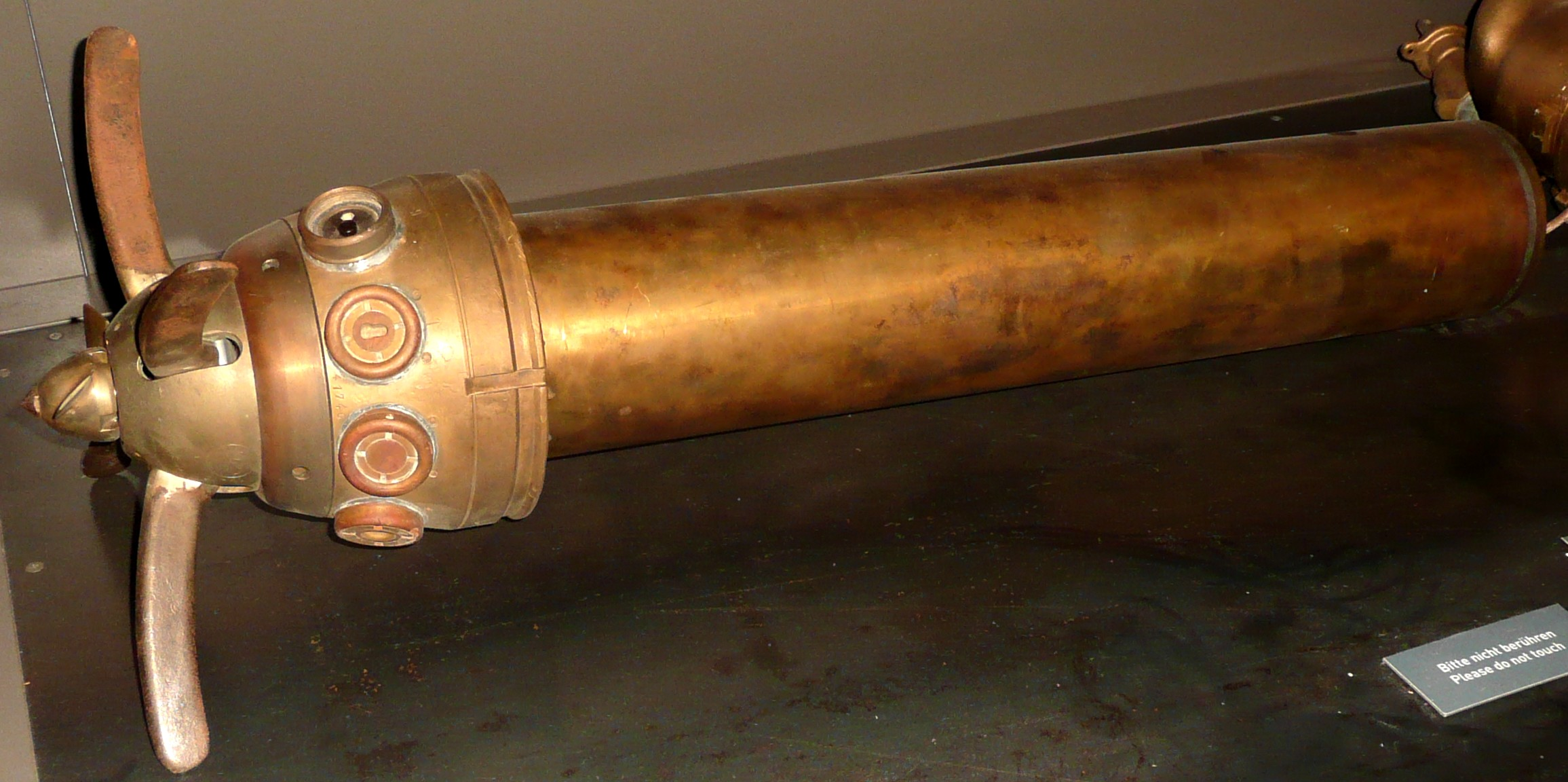
The contact fuze of a G7a torpedo, a hybrid design using both impact and swing-arm inertial triggering.

A fuze assembly may include more than one fuze in series or parallel arrangements. The RPG-7 usually has an impact (PIBD) fuze in parallel with a 4.5 second time fuze, so detonation should occur on impact, but otherwise takes place after 4.5 seconds. Military weapons containing explosives have fuzing systems including a series time fuze to ensure that they do not initiate (explode) prematurely within a danger distance of the munition launch platform. In general, the munition has to travel a certain distance, wait for a period of time (via a clockwork, electronic or chemical delay mechanism), or have some form of arming pin or plug removed. Only when these processes have occurred will the arming process of the series time fuze be complete. Mines often have a parallel time fuze to detonate and destroy the mine after a pre-determined period to minimize casualties after the anticipated duration of hostilities. Detonation of modern naval mines may require simultaneous detection of a series arrangement of acoustic, magnetic, and/or pressure sensors to complicate mine-sweeping efforts.

== Safety and arming mechanisms ==
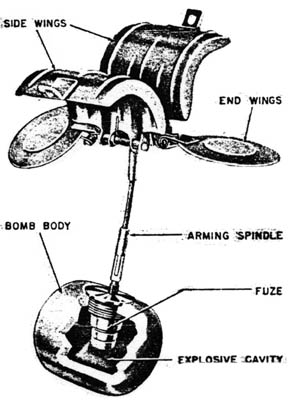
SD2 Butterfly bomb c. 1940 - wings rotate as bomb falls, unscrewing the arming spindle connected to the fuze

The multiple safety/arming features in the M734 fuze used for mortars are representative of the sophistication of modern electronic fuzes.

Safety/arming mechanisms can be as simple as the spring-loaded safety levers on M67 or RGD-5 grenade fuzes, which will not initiate the explosive train so long as the pin is kept in the grenade, or the safety lever is held down on a pinless grenade. Alternatively, it can be as complex as the electronic timer-countdown on an influence sea mine, which gives the vessel laying it sufficient time to move out of the blast zone before the magnetic or acoustic sensors are fully activated.

In modern artillery shells, most fuzes incorporate several safety features to prevent a fuze arming before it leaves the gun barrel. These safety features may include arming on "setback" or by centrifugal force, and often both operating together. Set-back arming uses the inertia of the accelerating artillery shell to remove a safety feature as the projectile accelerates from rest to its in-flight speed. Rotational arming requires that the artillery shell reach a certain rpm before centrifugal forces cause a safety feature to disengage or move an arming mechanism to its armed position. Artillery shells are fired through a rifled barrel, which forces them to spin during flight.

In other cases the bomb, mine or projectile has a fuze that prevents accidental initiation e.g. stopping the rotation of a small propeller (unless a lanyard pulls out a pin) so that the striker-pin cannot hit the detonator even if the weapon is dropped on the ground. These types of fuze operate with aircraft weapons, where the weapon may have to be jettisoned over friendly territory to allow a damaged aircraft to continue to fly. The crew can choose to jettison the weapons safe by dropping the devices with safety pins still attached, or drop them live by removing the safety pins as the weapons leave the aircraft.

Aerial bombs and depth charges can be nose and tail fuzed using different detonator/initiator characteristics so that the crew can choose which effect fuze will suit target conditions that may not have been known before the flight. The arming switch is set to one of safe, nose, or tail at the crew's choice.

Base fuzes are also used by artillery and tanks for shells of the 'squash head' type. Some types of armour piercing shells have also used base fuzes, as have nuclear artillery shells.

The most sophisticated fuze mechanisms of all are those fitted to nuclear weapons, and their safety/arming devices are correspondingly complex. In addition to PAL protection, the fuzing used in nuclear weapons features multiple, highly sophisticated environmental sensors e.g. sensors requiring highly specific acceleration and deceleration profiles before the warhead can be fully armed. The intensity and duration of the acceleration/deceleration must match the environmental conditions which the bomb/missile warhead would actually experience when dropped or fired. Furthermore, these events must occur in the correct order. As an additional safety precaution, most modern nuclear weapons utilize a timed two point detonation system such that ONLY a precisely timed firing of both detonators in sequence will result in the correct conditions to cause a fission reaction

Note: some fuzes, e.g. those used in air-dropped bombs and landmines may contain anti-handling devices specifically designed to kill bomb disposal personnel. The technology to incorporate booby-trap mechanisms in fuzes has existed since at least 1940 e.g. the German ZUS40 anti-removal bomb fuze.

== Reliability ==
A fuze must be designed to function appropriately considering relative movement of the munition with respect to its target. The target may move past stationary munitions like land mines or naval mines; or the target may be approached by a rocket, torpedo, artillery shell, or air-dropped bomb. Timing of fuze function may be described as optimum if detonation occurs when target damage will be maximized, early if detonation occurs prior to optimum, late if detonation occurs past optimum, or dud if the munition fails to detonate. Any given batch of a specific design may be tested to determine the anticipated percentage of early, optimum, late, and dud expected from that fuze installation.

Combination fuze design attempts to maximize optimum detonation while recognizing dangers of early fuze function (and potential dangers of late function for subsequent occupation of the target zone by friendly forces or for gravity return of anti-aircraft munitions used in defense of surface positions.) Series fuze combinations minimize early function by detonating at the latest activation of the individual components. Series combinations are useful for safety arming devices, but increase the percentage of late and dud munitions. Parallel fuze combinations minimize duds by detonating at the earliest activation of individual components, but increase the possibility of premature early function of the munition. Sophisticated military munition fuzes typically contain an arming device in series with a parallel arrangement of sensing fuzes for target destruction and a time fuze for self-destruction if no target is detected.

== Gallery ==
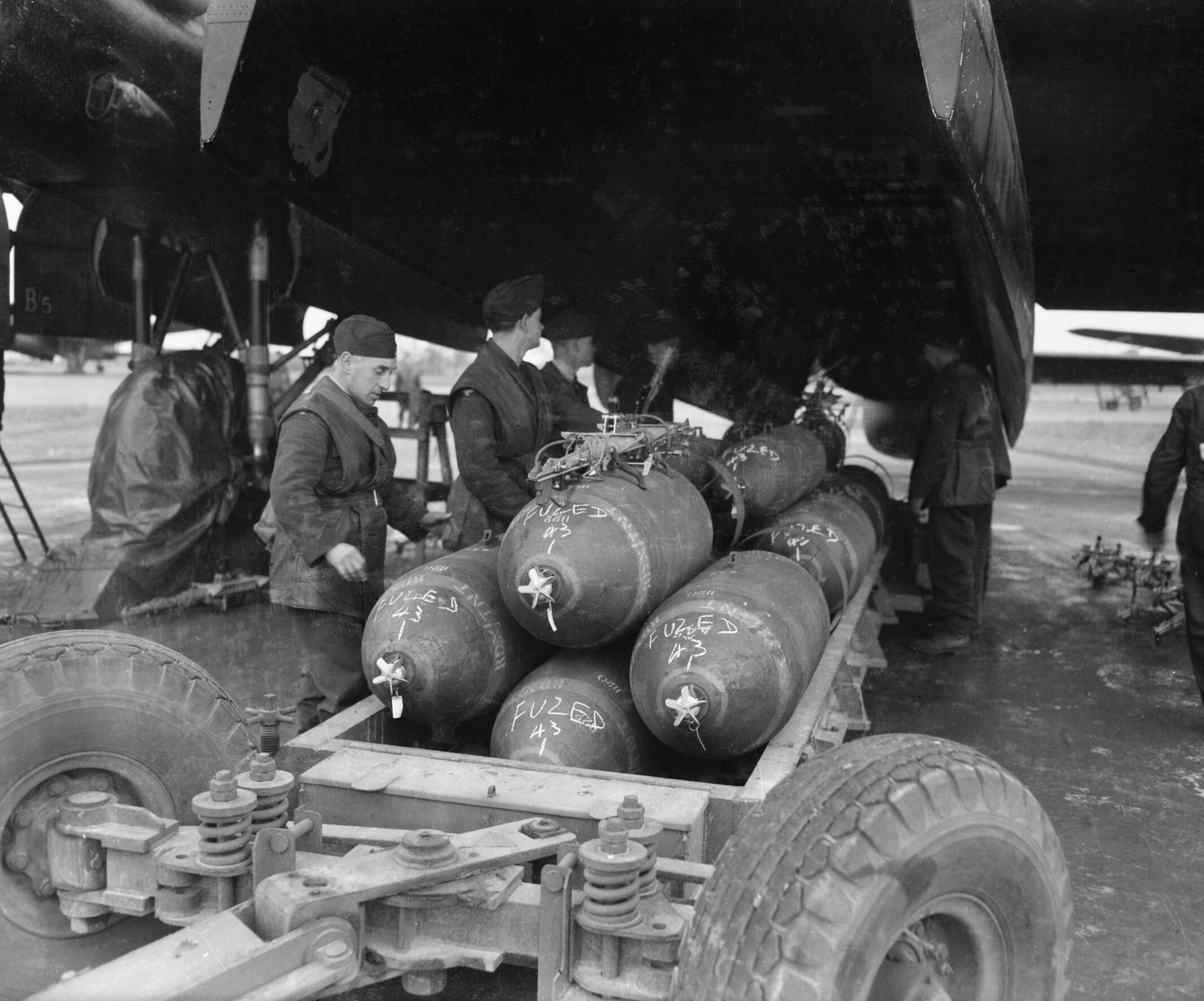
Avro Lancaster at RAF Metheringham. Note the "Fuzed" status, chalked on the nose of each bomb

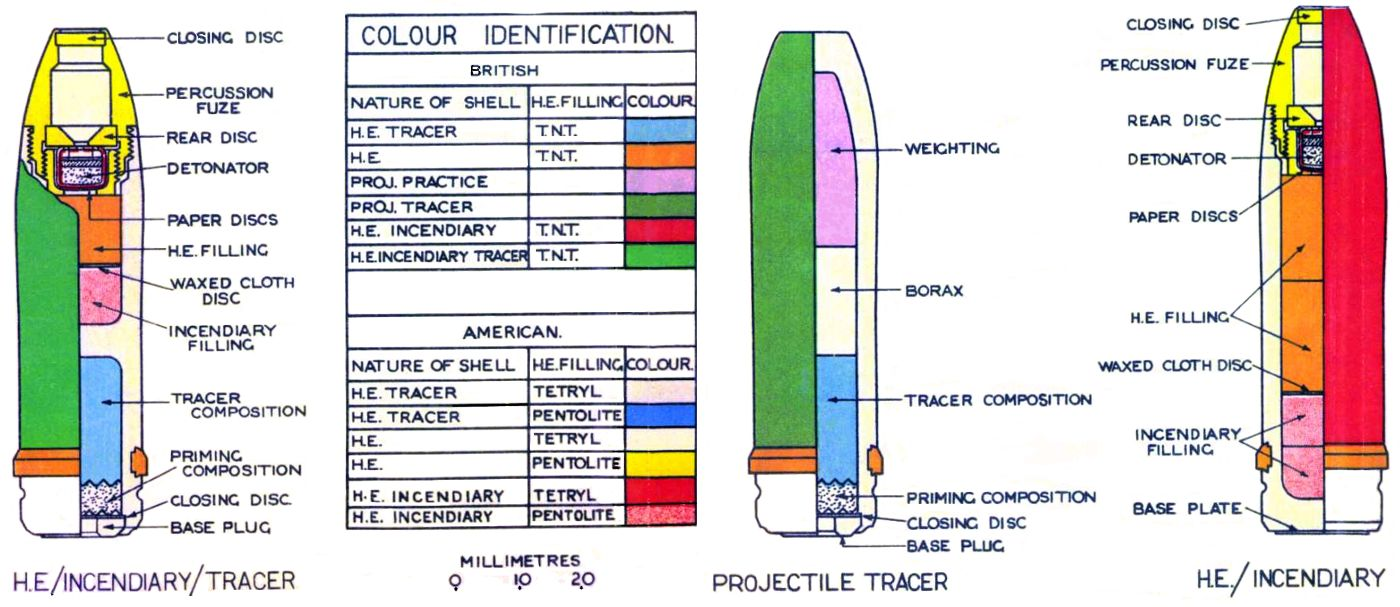
Oerlikon 20 mm cannon fuze

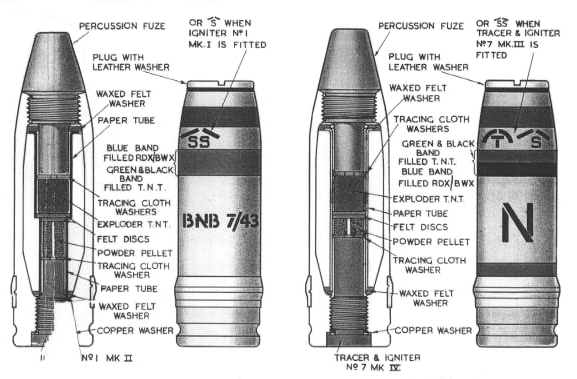
Cross-sectional views of QF 2-pounder naval gun shells, showing percussion fuzes.

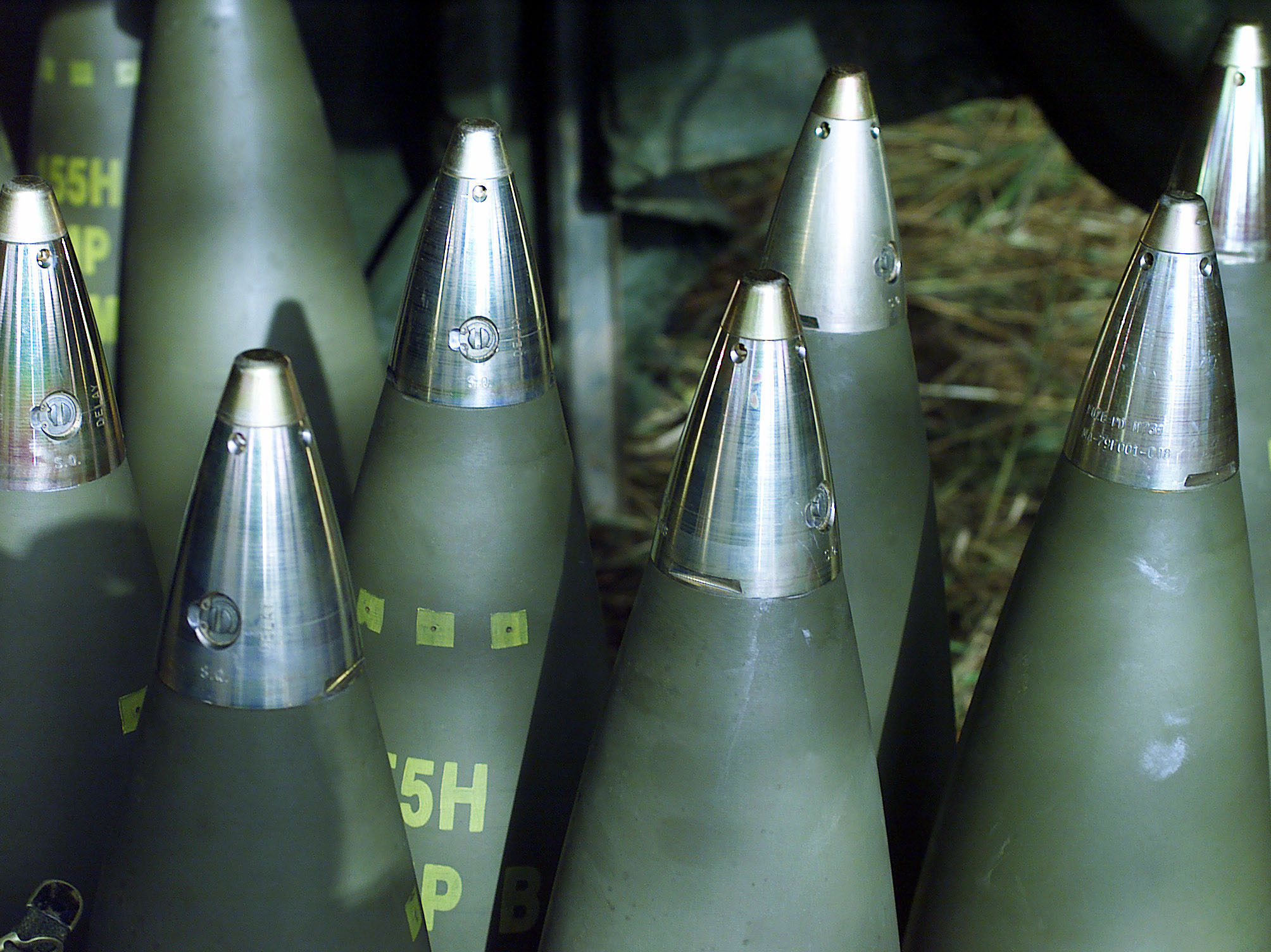
Fuzes fitted to M107 155mm artillery shells, c. 2000

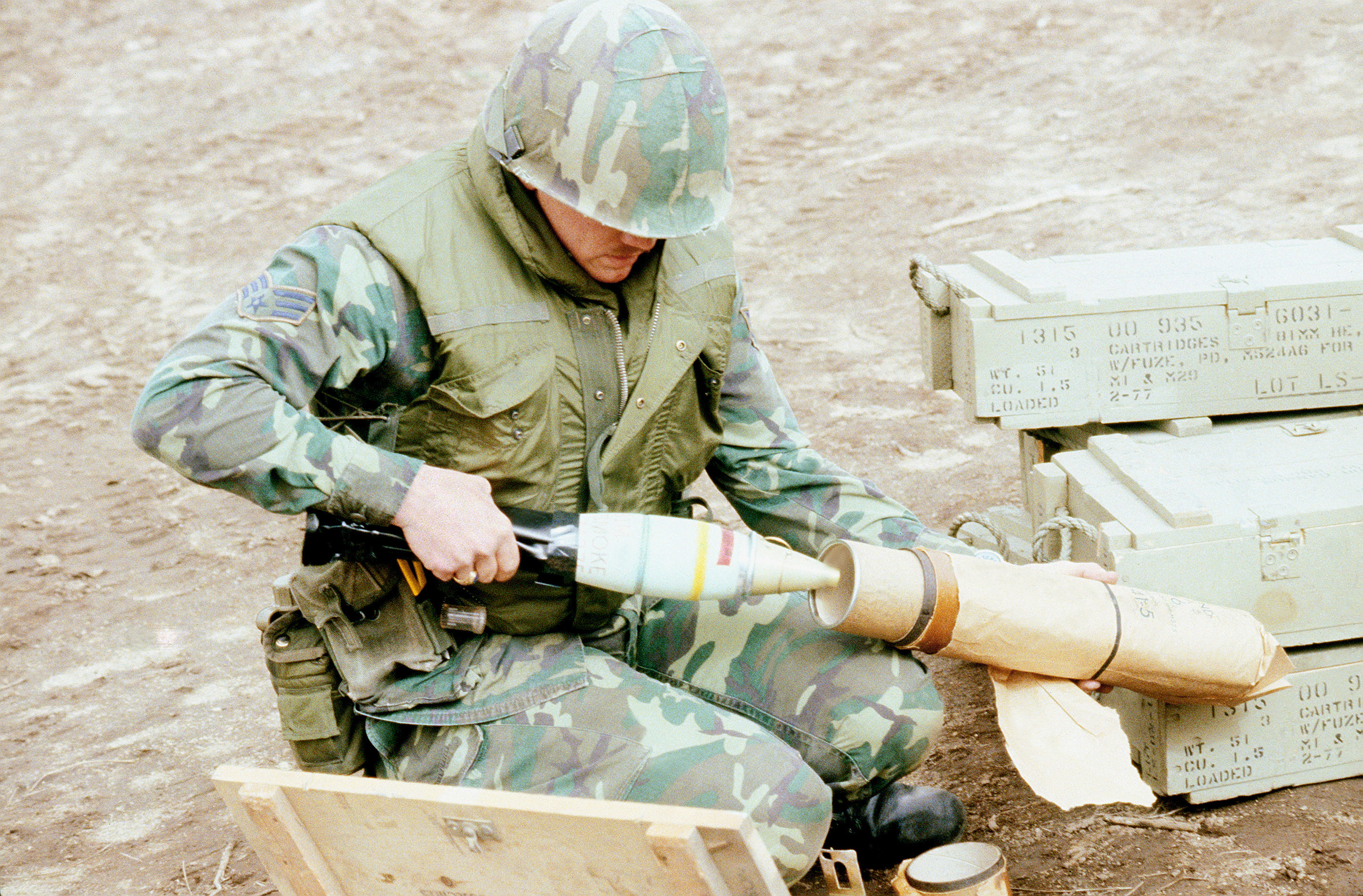
Fuzed 81mm white phosphorus mortar shell in 1980. Note spelling of "fuze" on adjacent boxes

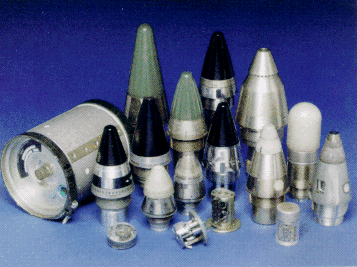
An assortment of fuzes for artillery and mortar shells

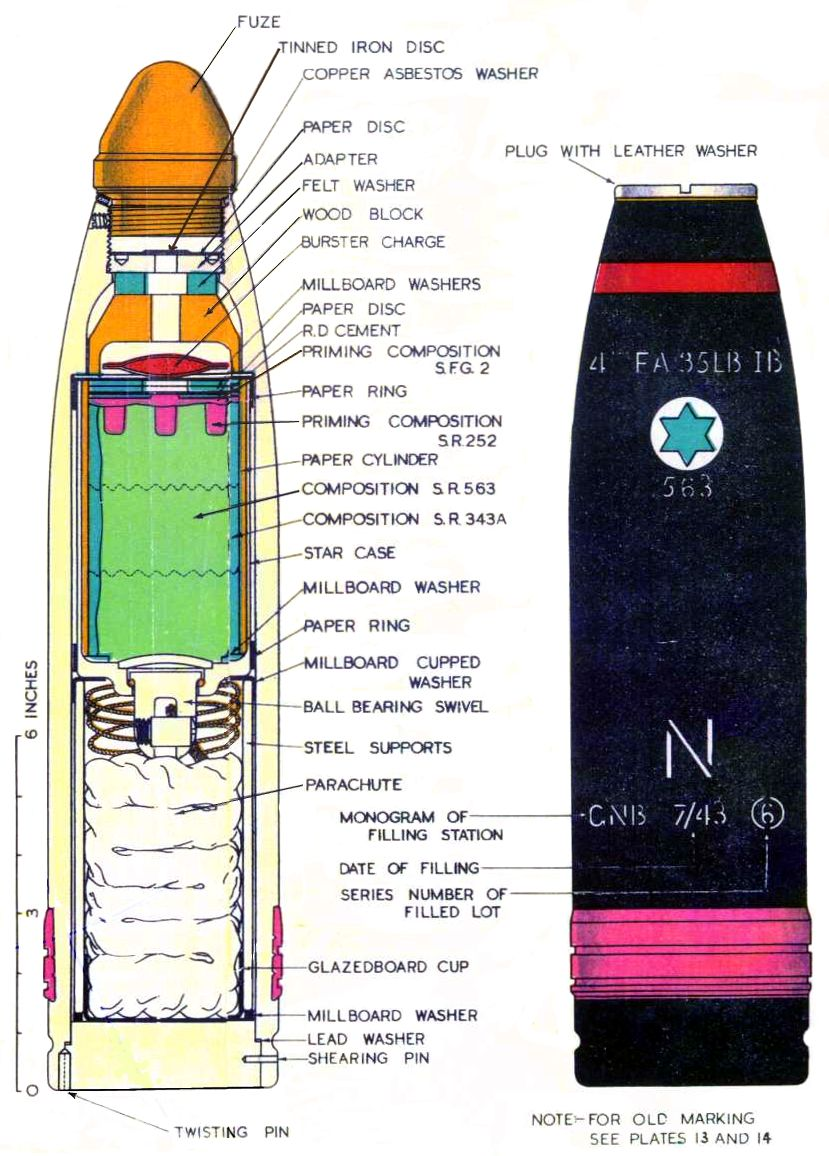
British World War II 4-inch naval illuminating shell, showing time fuze (orange, top), illuminating compound (green) and parachute (white, bottom)

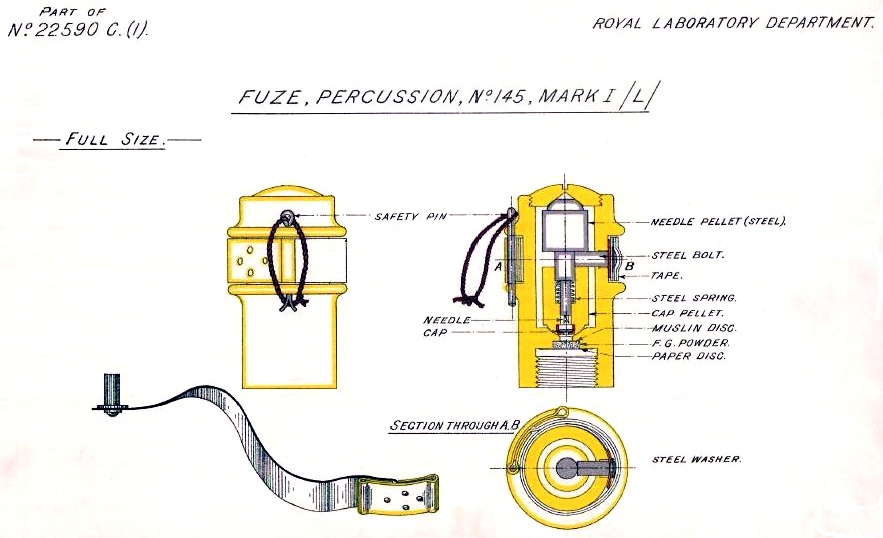
Fuze for a Stokes mortar shell

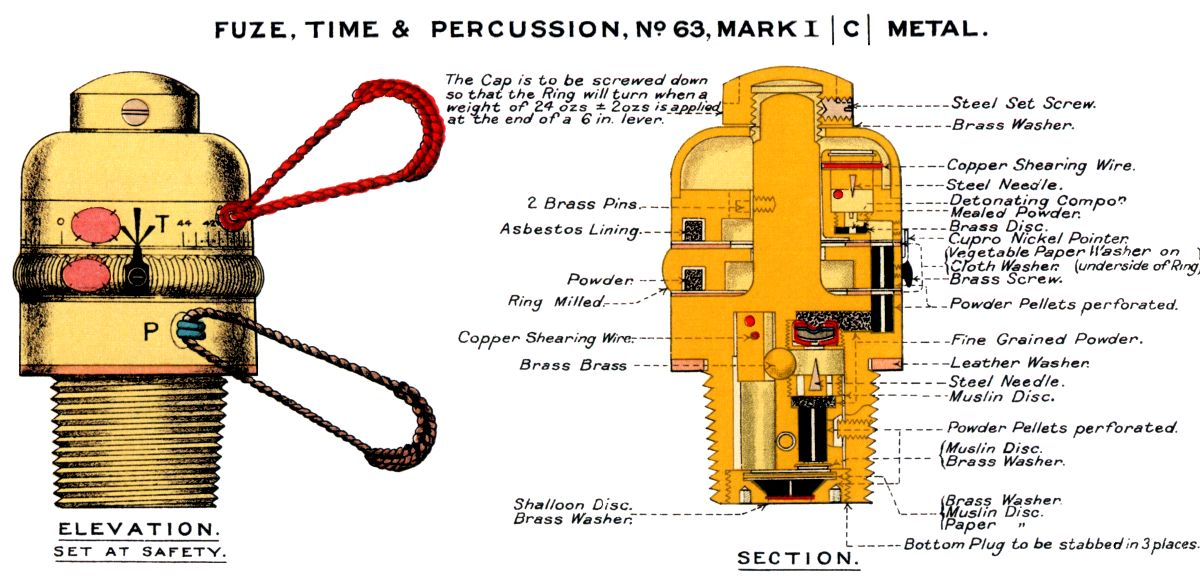
British No. 63 Mk I Time and Percussion fuze, c. 1915, used in shrapnel shells

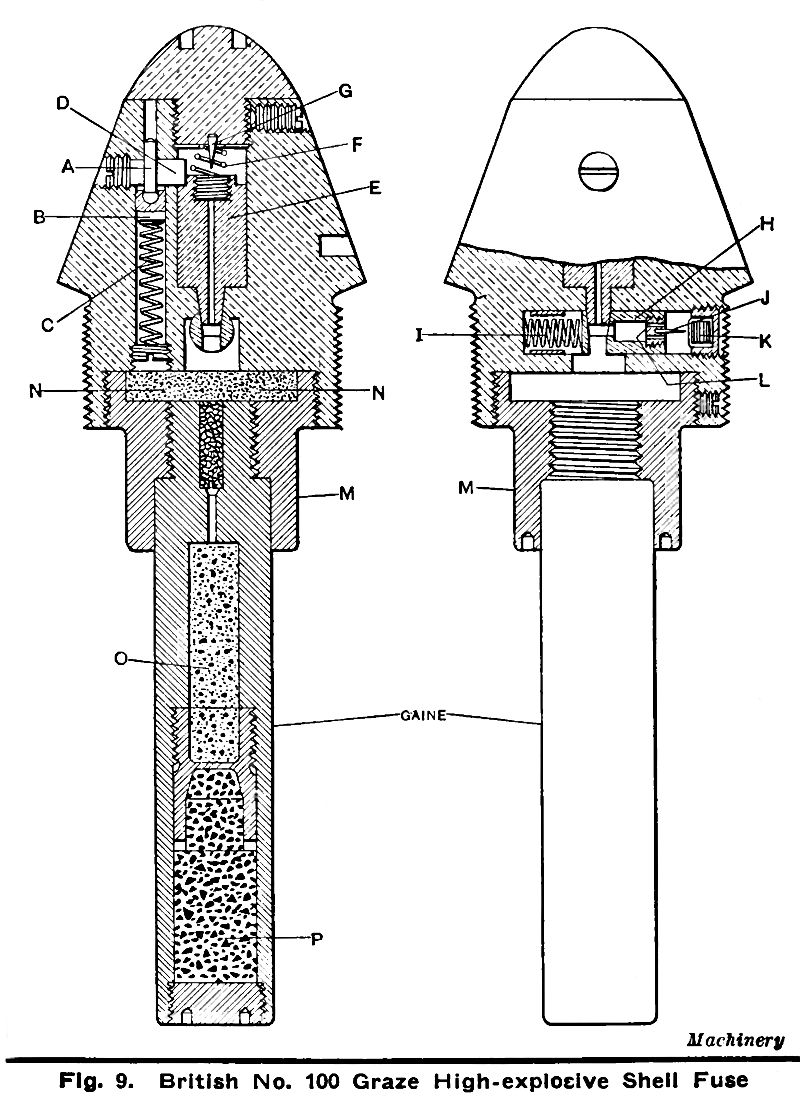
British No. 100 Graze Fuze for high-explosive shell, World War I.

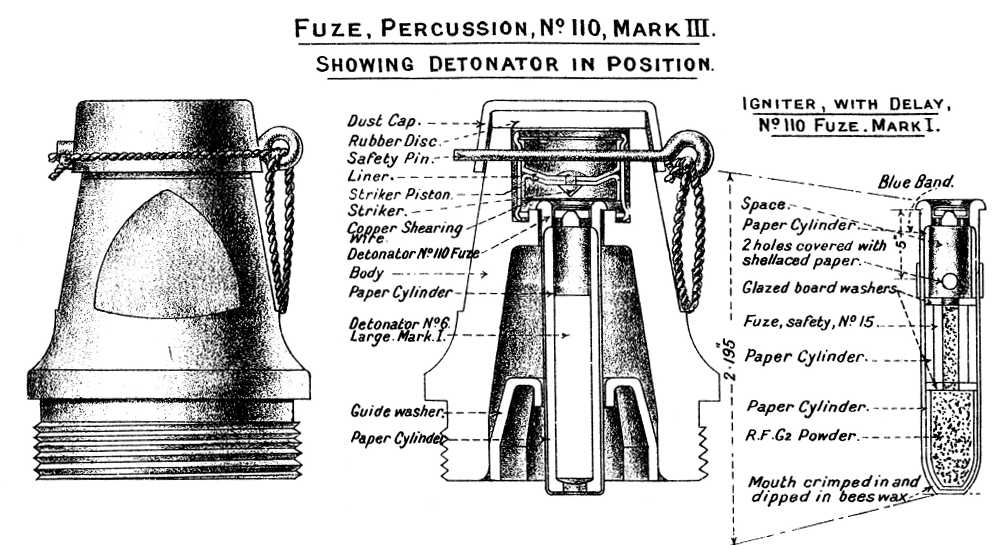
British Percussion Fuze No. 110 Mk III, World War I, used in trench mortars

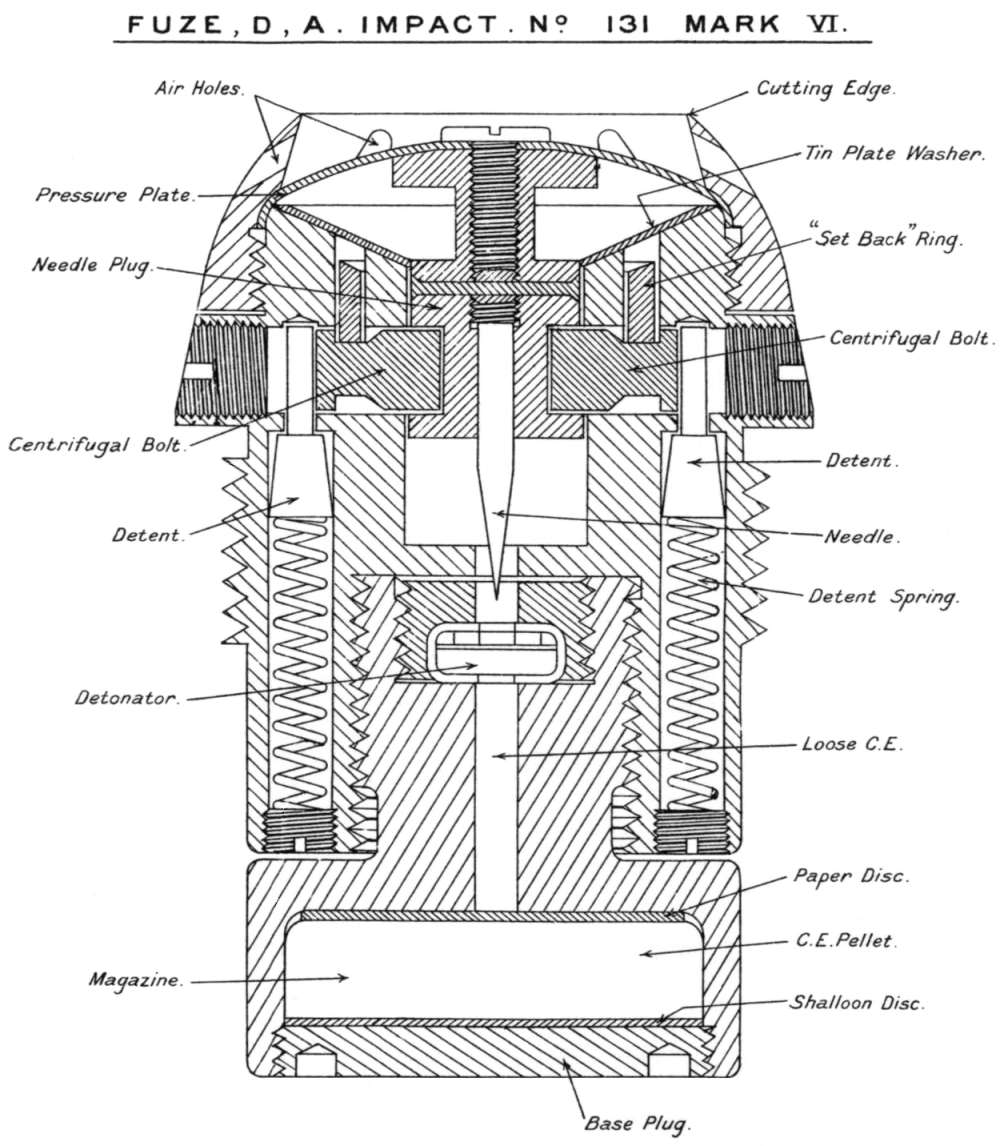
British No. 131 D.A. (Direct Action) Impact Fuze, Mk VI, World War I, used in anti-aircraft artillery

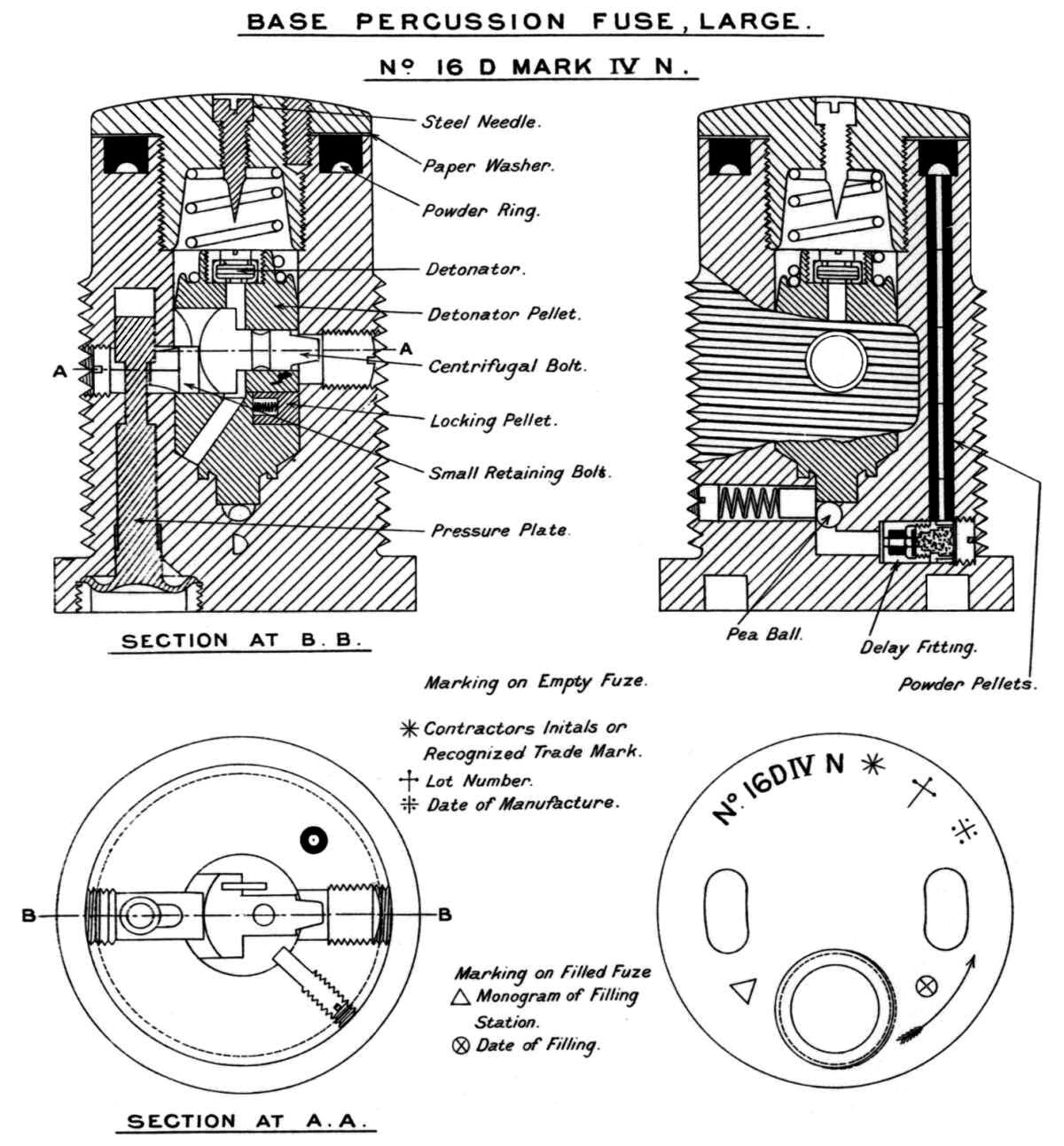
British No. 16 D Mk IV N Base percussion fuze, c. 1936

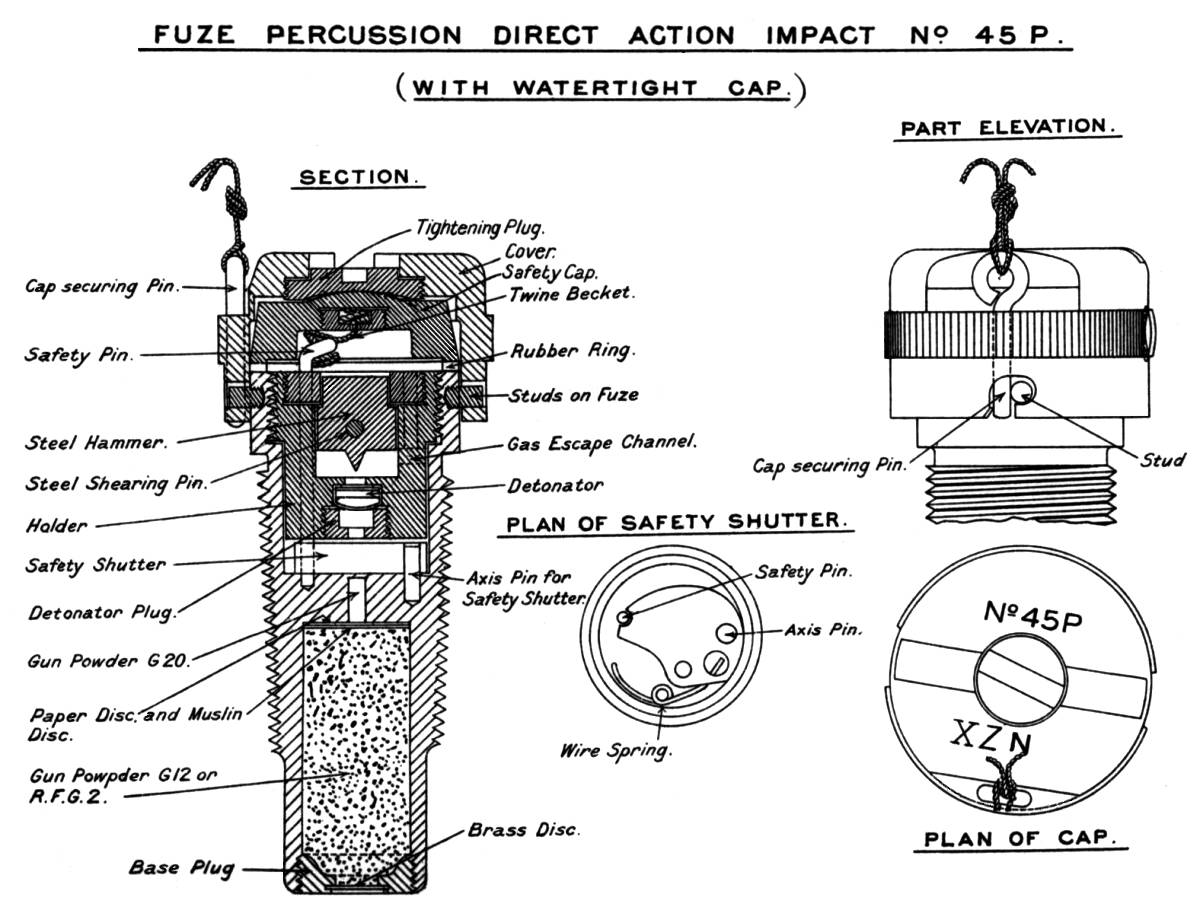
British No. 45 P Direct Action Impact Fuze, World War I, used in howitzer shells

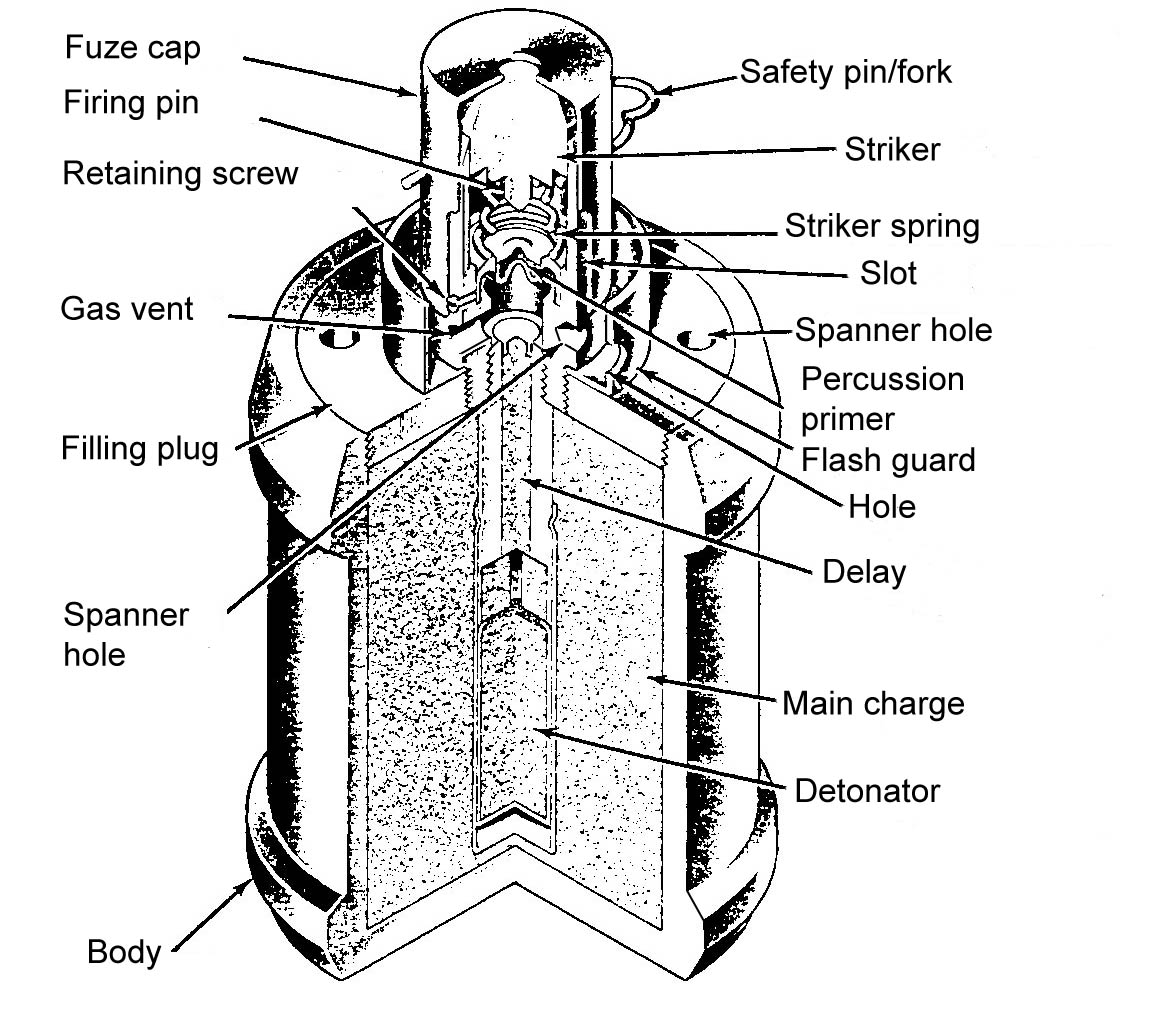
Cut-away diagram of Japanese Type 99 Grenade showing fuze mechanism. c. 1939

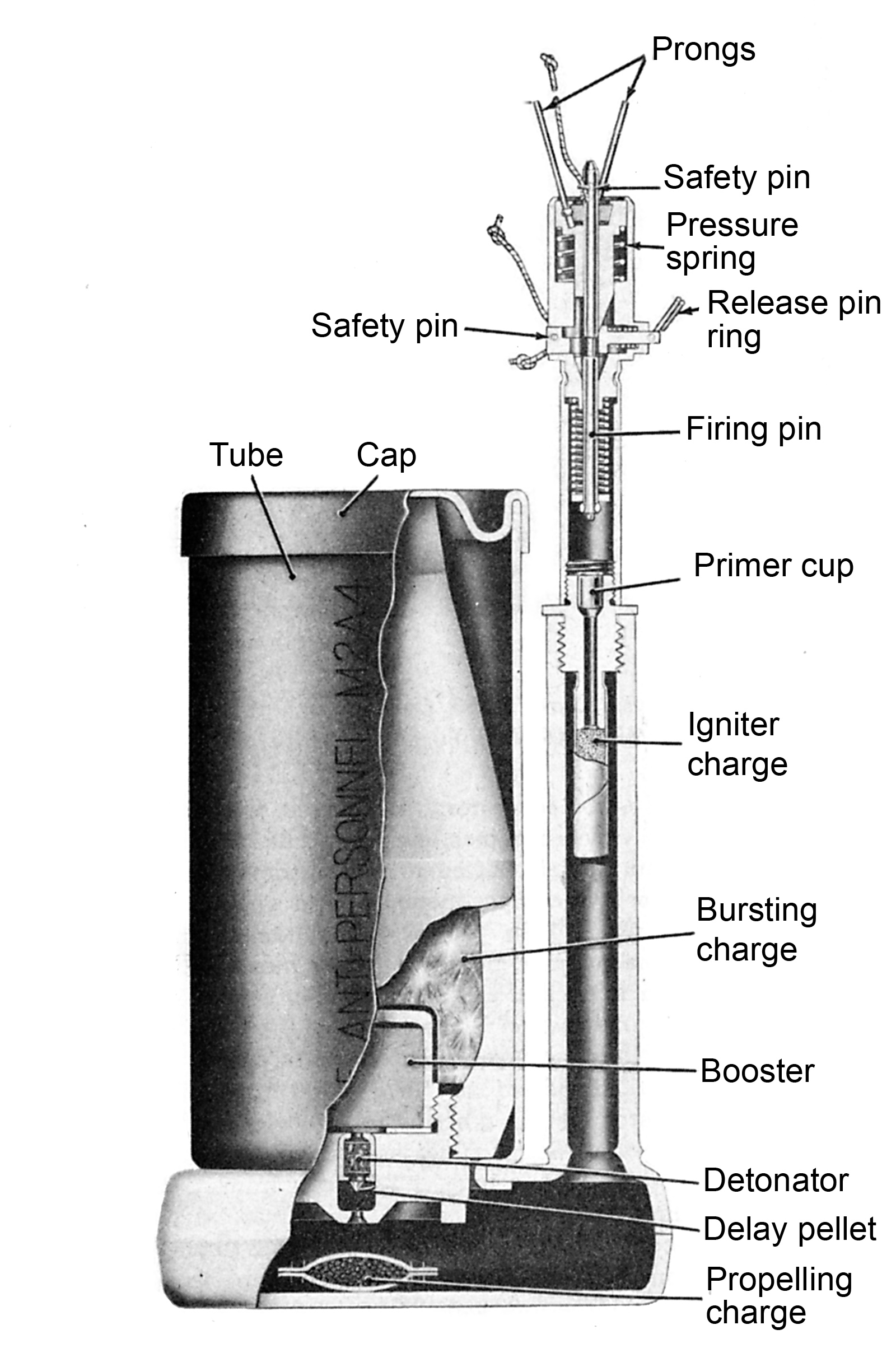
Cut-away diagram of a US M2A4 bounding mine showing the M6A1 pressure/pull fuze. c. 1950

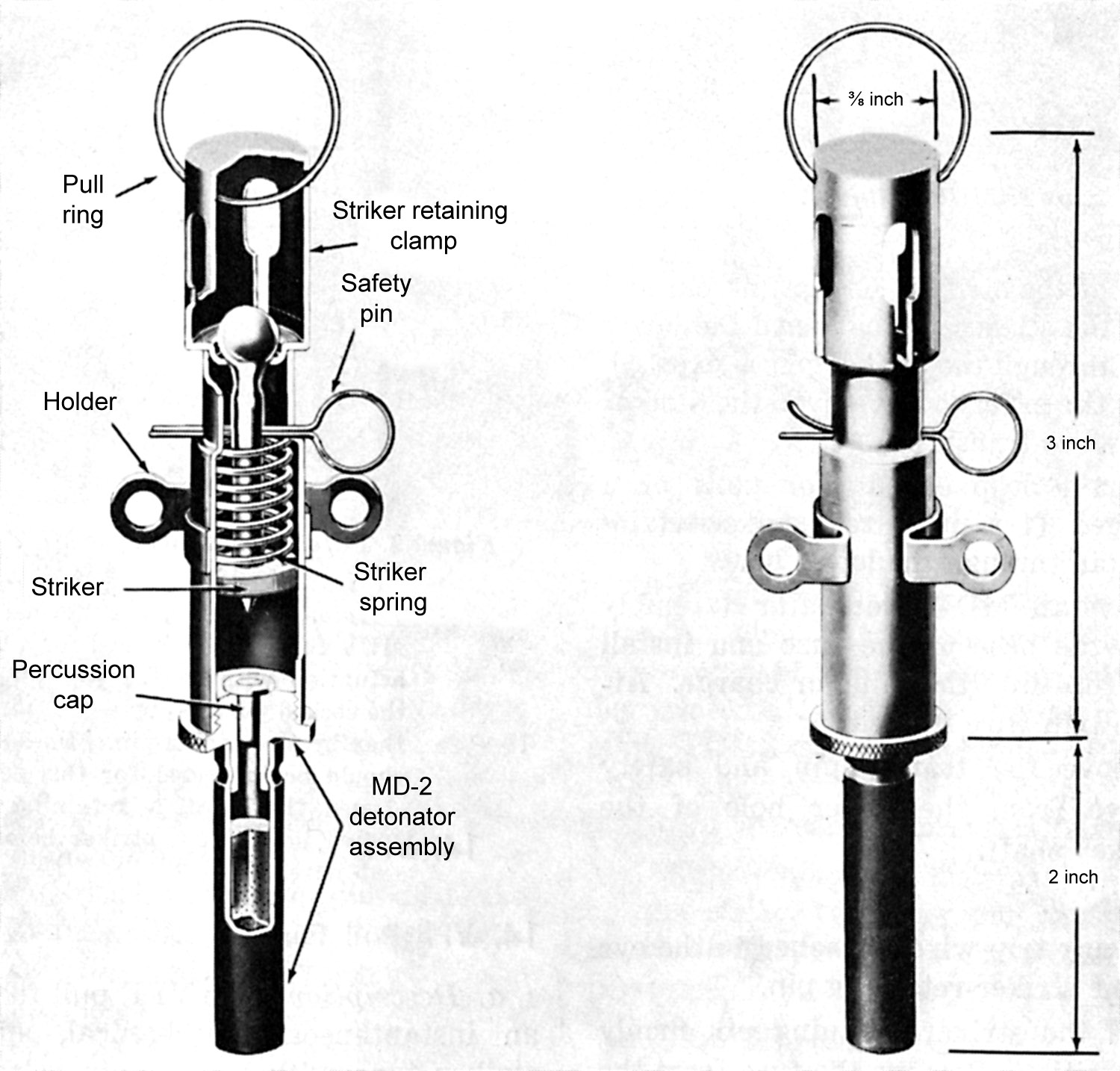
USSR pull-fuze designed for booby-trap or anti-handling purposes. c. 1950s. Detonator assembly is inserted into explosives

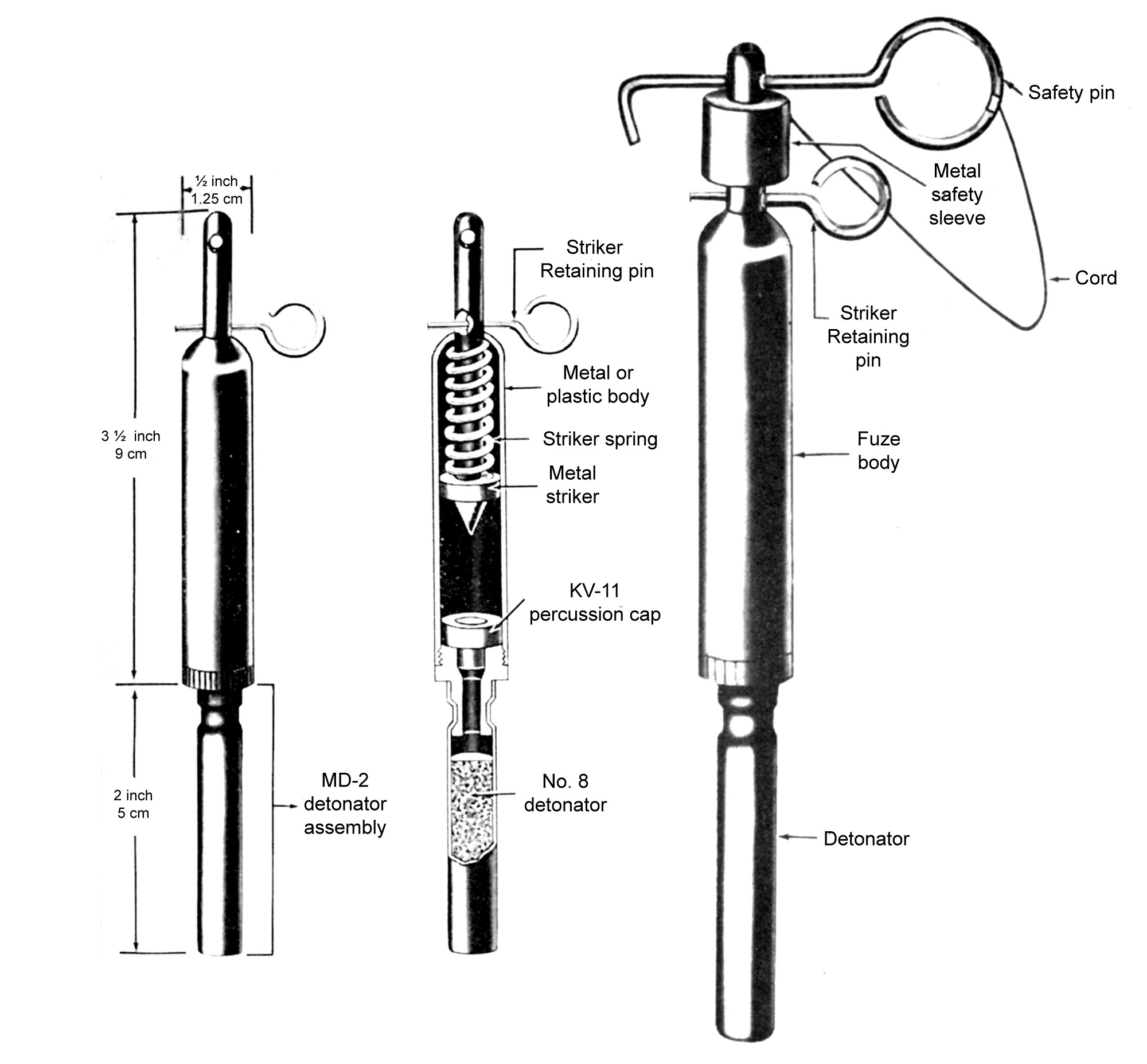
Alternative design of USSR booby-trap pull-fuze, usually connected to a tripwire. c. 1950s

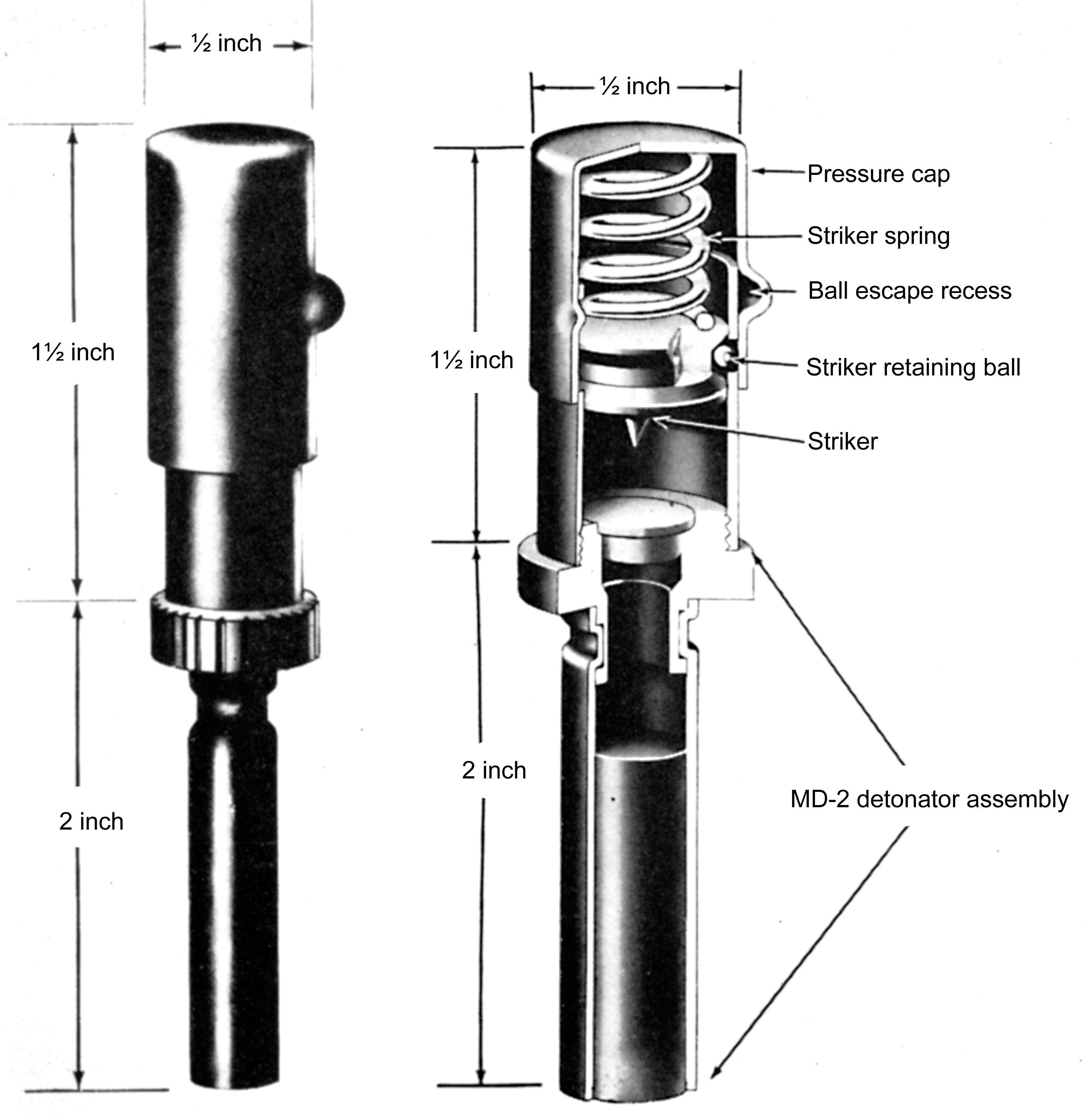
USSR pressure fuze for booby-trap purposes e.g. victim steps on loose floorboard with fuze (connected to TNT explosives) concealed underneath. c. 1950s

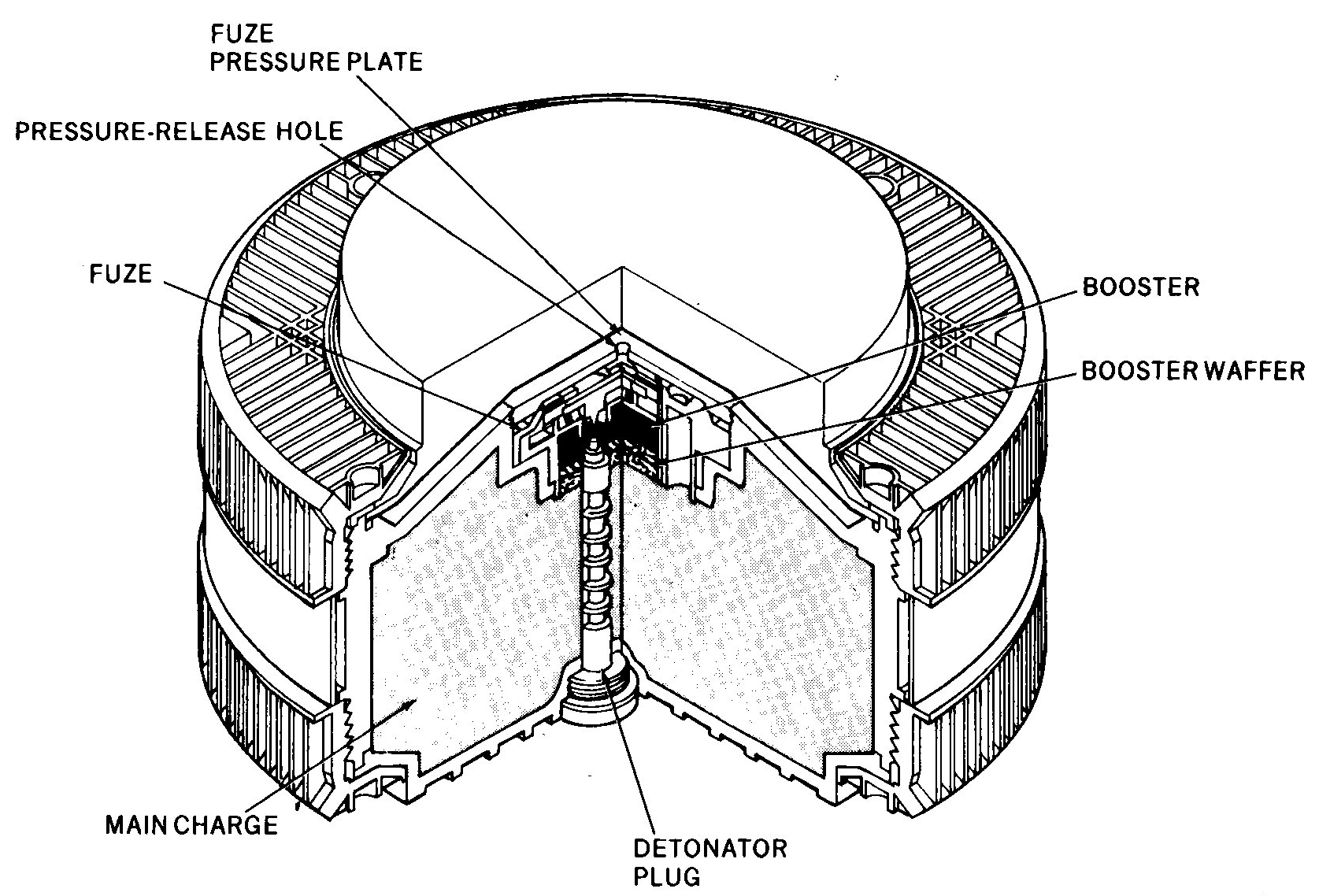
Italian TC/2.4 mine c. 1980s showing central location of mechanical pressure fuze

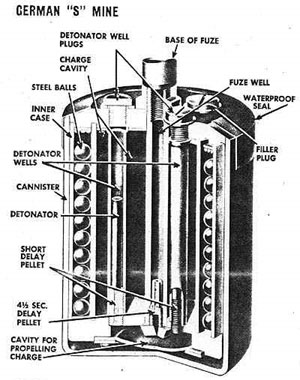
German S-mine dating from World War II showing fuze well into which a 3-pronged fuze would be screwed

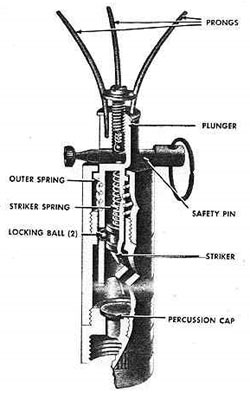
Fuze for a German S-mine, which would be screwed into the fuze well on the mine

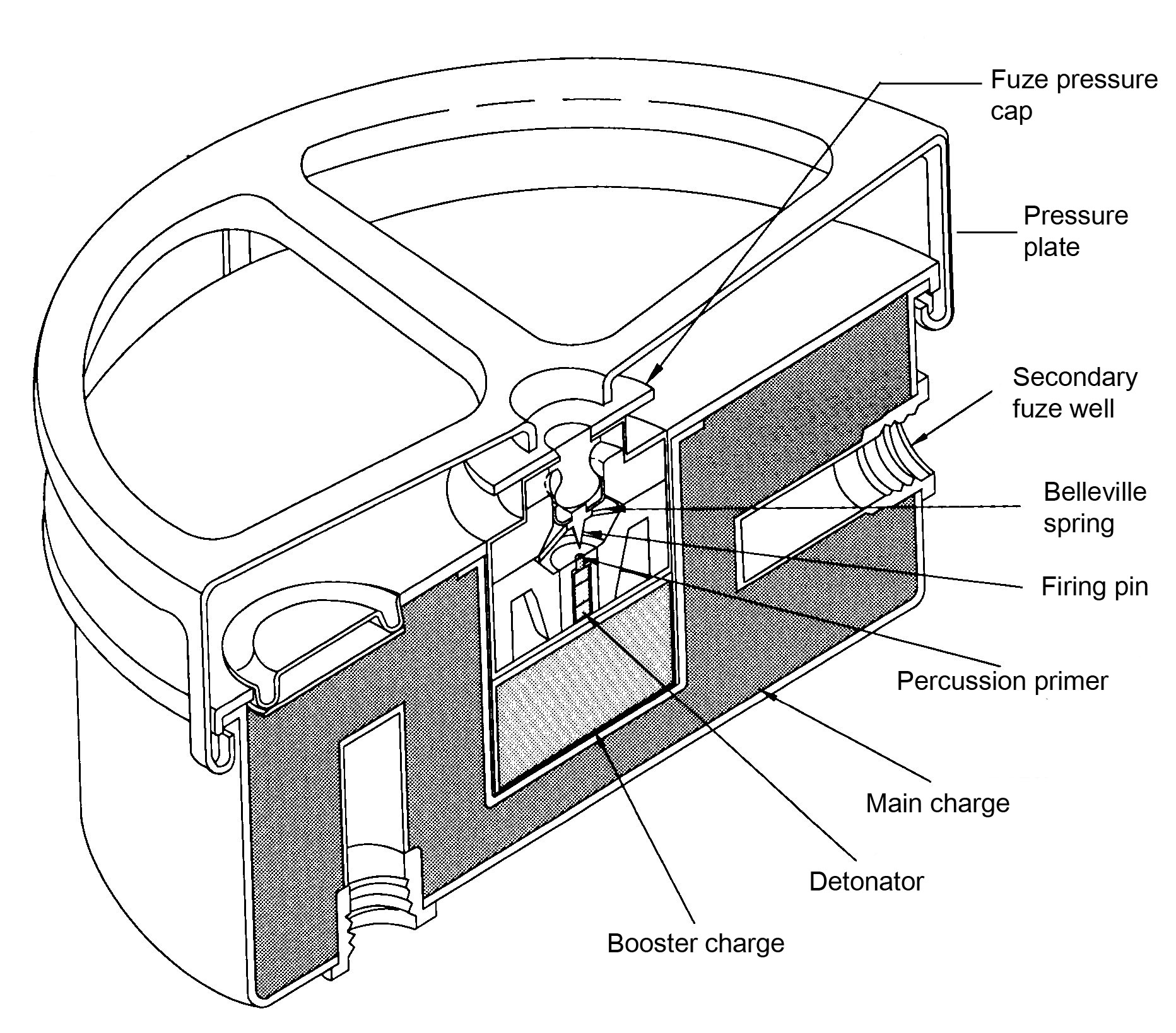
M4 anti tank mine, showing main fuze in the centre, plus 2 additional fuze pockets (both empty) which provide the option to fit anti-handling devices

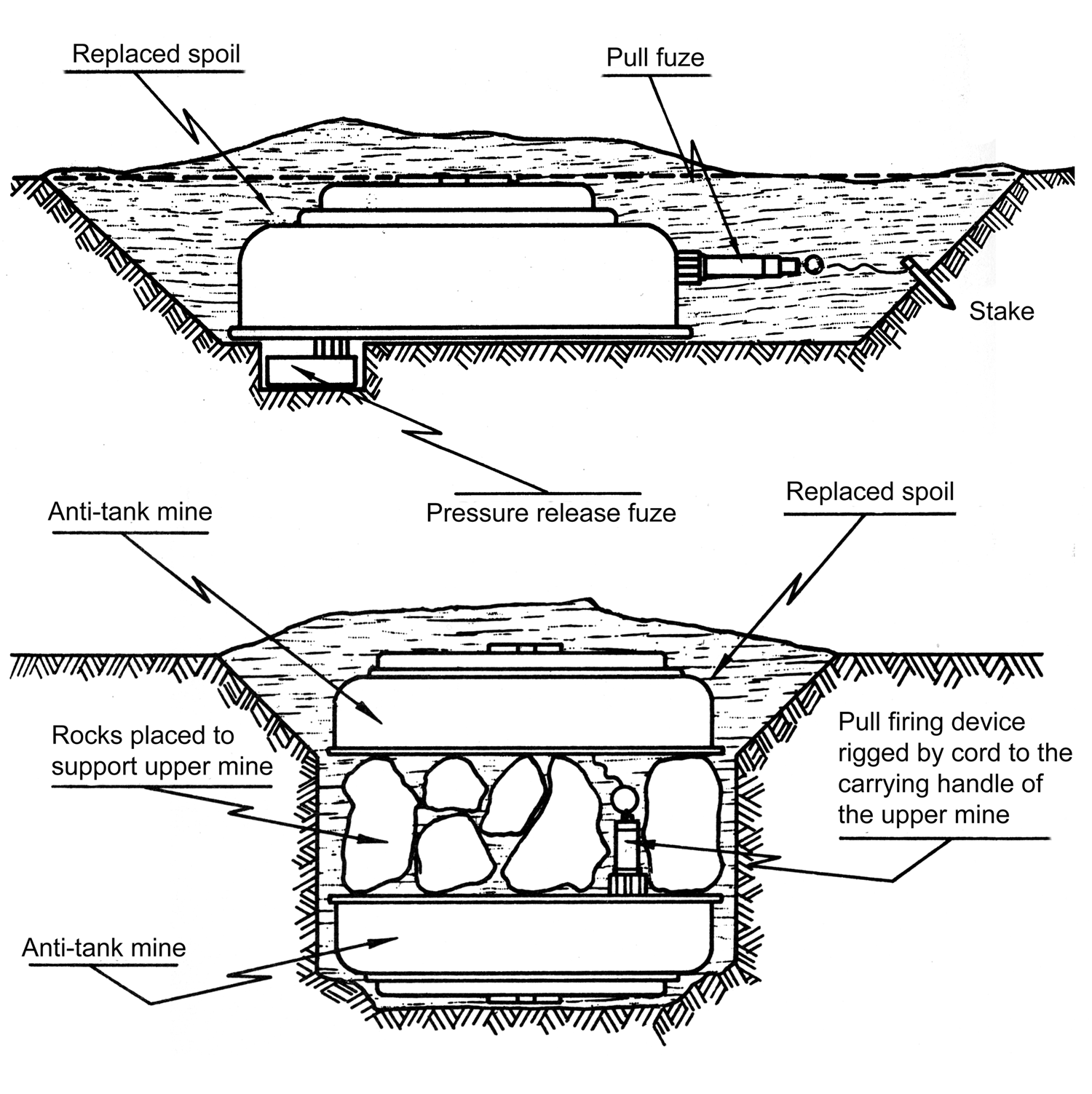
Typical configuration of a pull fuze and/or pressure-release fuze attached to M15 anti-tank landmines

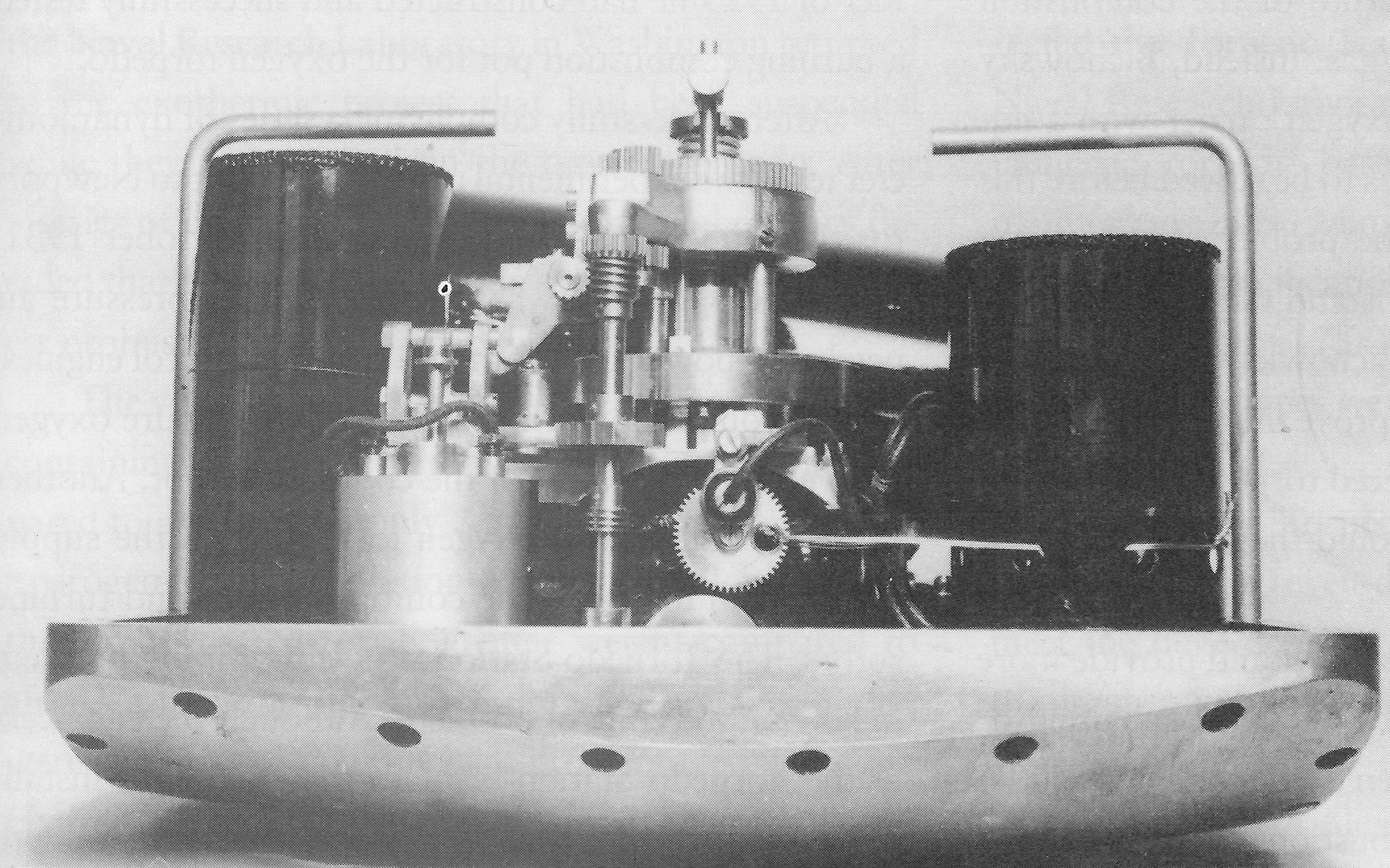
The problem-prone Mark 6 magnetic influence exploder for the Mark 14 submarine torpedo was secretly developed with limited testing between the world wars

== See also ==
- Artillery fuze – Type of munition fuze used with artillery munitions
- Black match – Type of fuse made of cotton
- Contact fuze – Device that detonates bomb on contact with hard surface
- Slow match – Slow-burning cord or twine fuse

== Sources ==
- Canada. Army Electronic Library. Field Artillery Volume 6. Ballistics and Ammunition. B-GL-306-006/FP-001 1992-06-01
- Ministry of Defence (Army Dept.) (1968). Explosives Terms and Definitions. A 32/ARTS/R & D/678.
