= Stage reading =

Form of theatre without sets or costumes

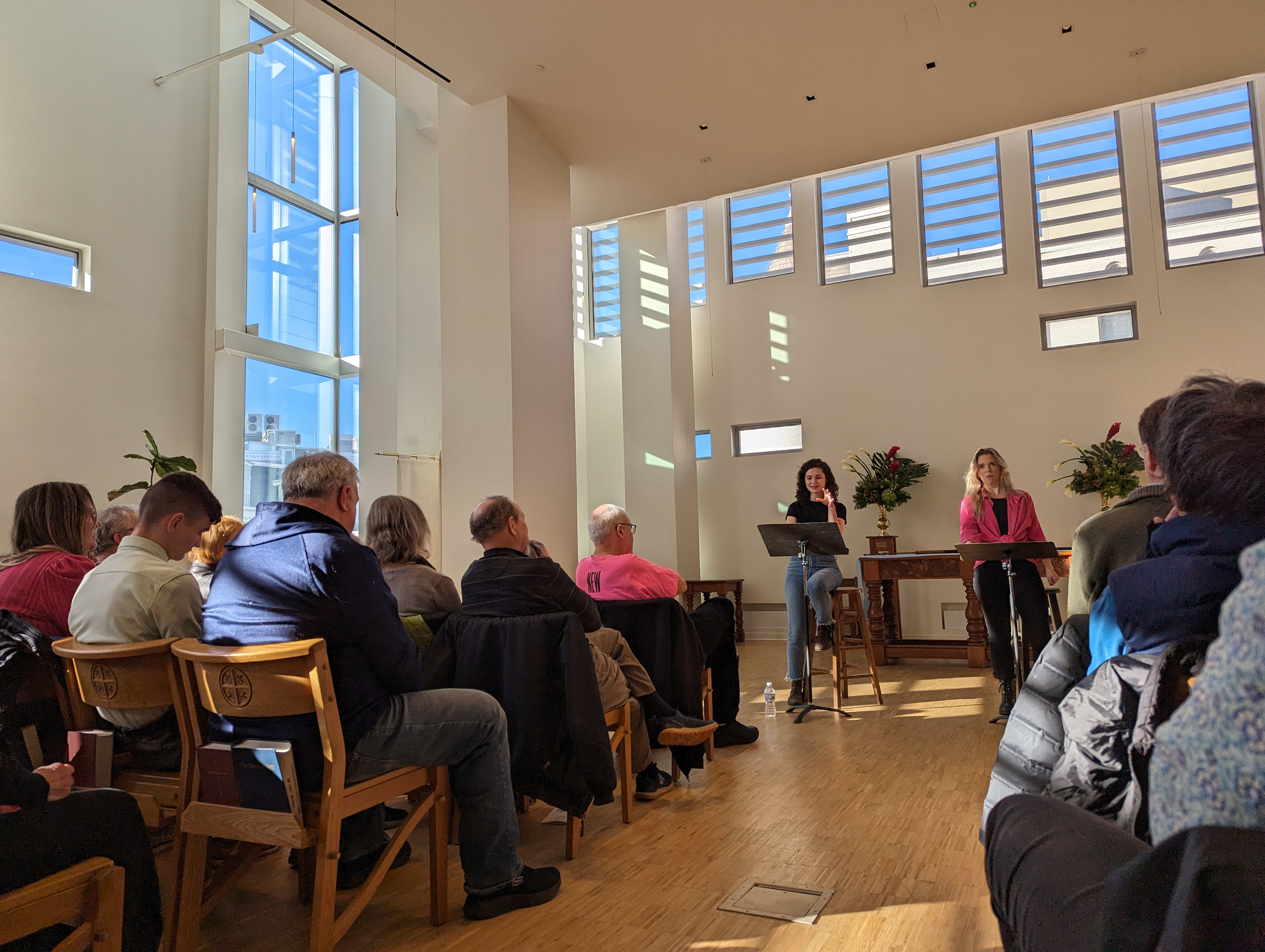
A stage reading of a play in Washington, D.C., held by Solas Nua

A stage reading, also known as a staged reading, is a form of theatre without sets or full costumes. The actors, who read from scripts, may be seated, stand in fixed positions, or incorporate minimal stage movement.

There is an overlap with the term play reading, One US source says that play reading incorporates little or no movement, while the latter is performed, with actions, on a stage.

== Description ==
A stage reading of a new play in development is an intermediate phase between a cold reading, with the cast usually sitting around a table, and a full production. A narrator may read stage directions aloud. The purpose is to gauge the effectiveness of the dialogue, pacing and flow, and other dramatic elements that the playwright or director may wish to adjust. Audience feedback contributes to the process. In play-development workshopping, the stage reading is one of the forms of workshop, along with the rehearsed reading, the exploratory workshop, and the full workshop production. It is an inexpensive way to get a new play in front of an audience.

Stage readings that include members of Actors' Equity (U.S.) in the cast are governed by that union's Stage Reading Guidelines.

== Screenplays ==
A screenplay in development that relies to a significant degree on dialogue rather than action may sometimes be given a stage reading, as a way to attract potential investors or to rehearse. As a form of public performance, the stage reading of a film script is like performing a radio play before a live audience, with emphasis on the use of imagination and on voice acting, which might require theatre actors and voice-over artists.

== Reader's theatre ==
Reader's theatre is the stage reading of a fully developed or classic play, when the reading is itself the performance.

== Notable dramatic readers ==
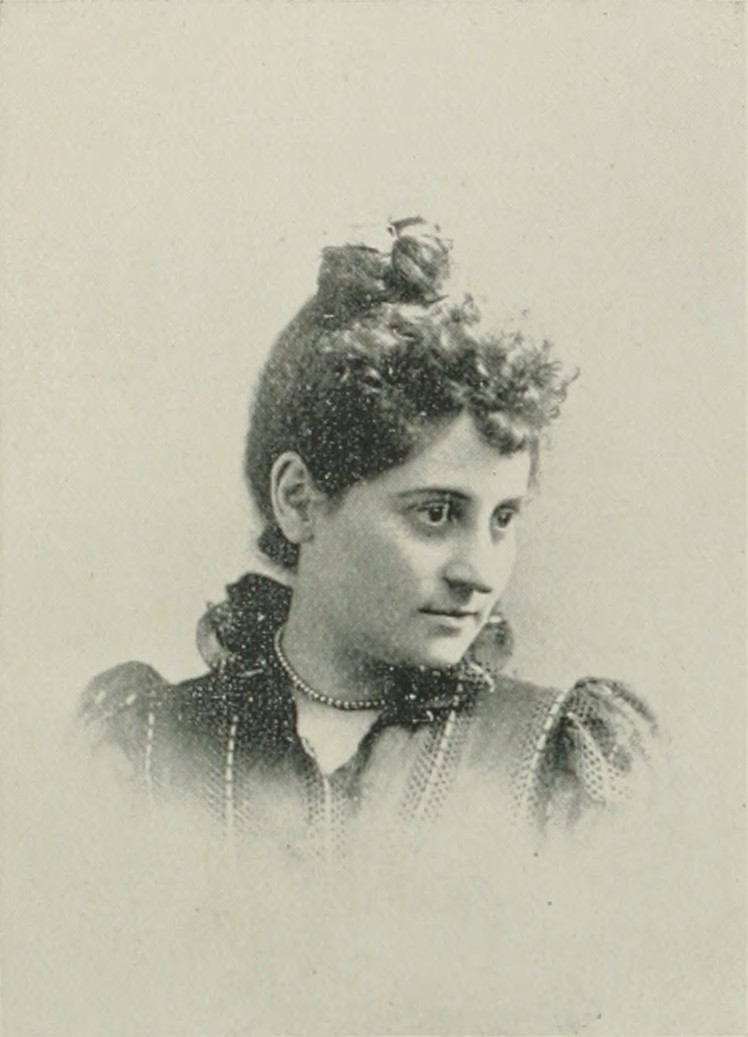
Florence Fowle Adams

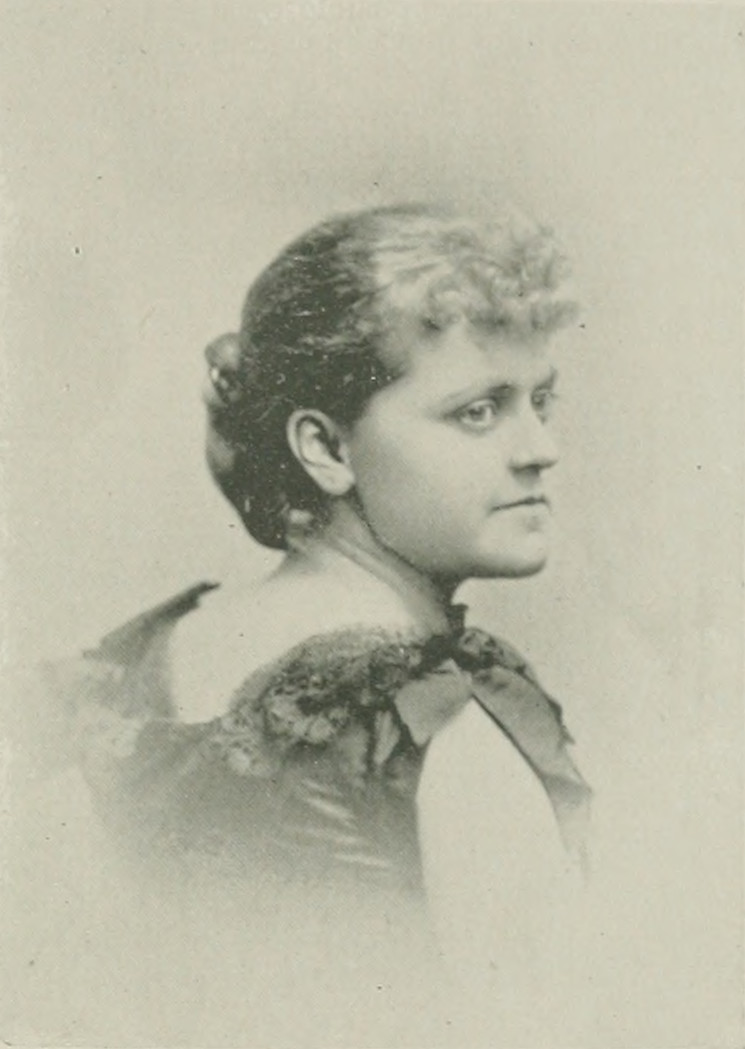
Helen Louise Babcock

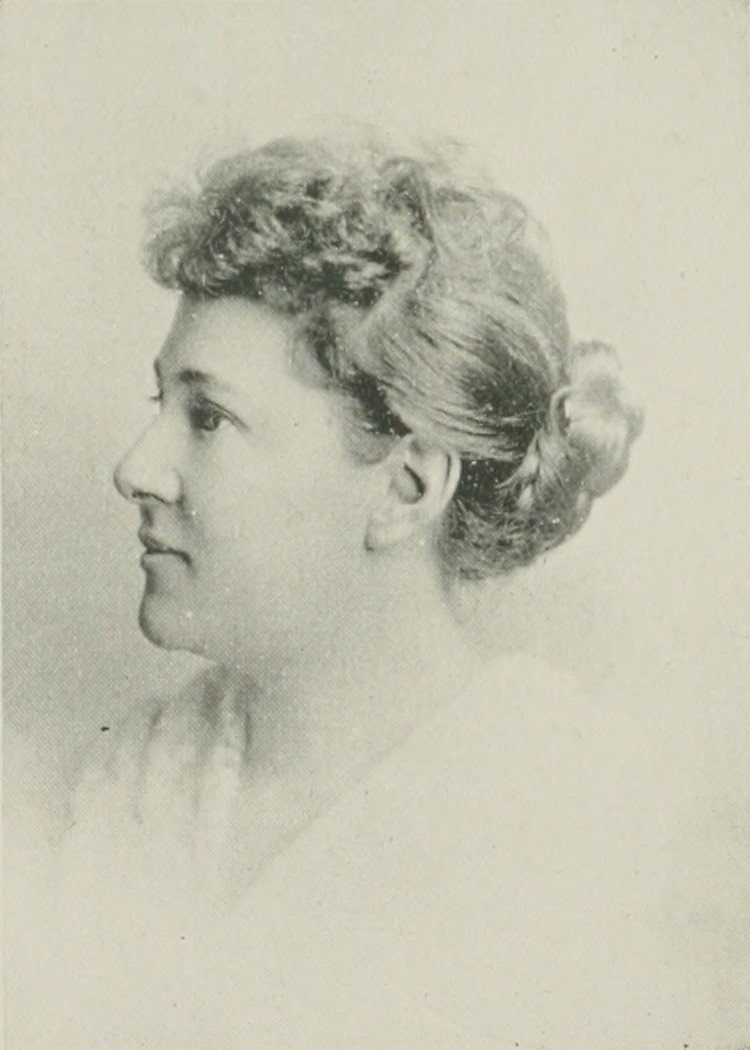
Mabelle Biggart

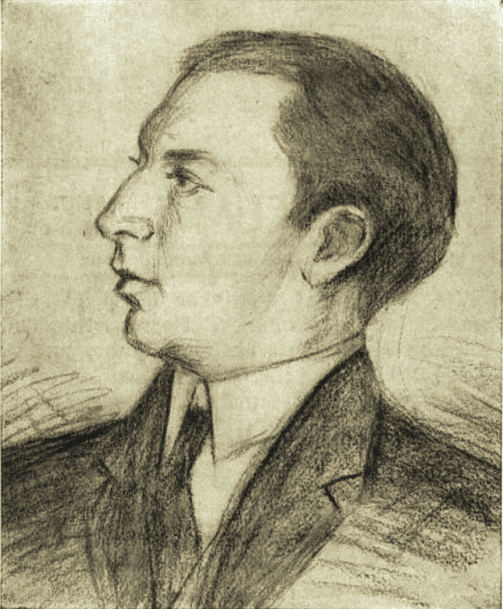
Edward Brigham

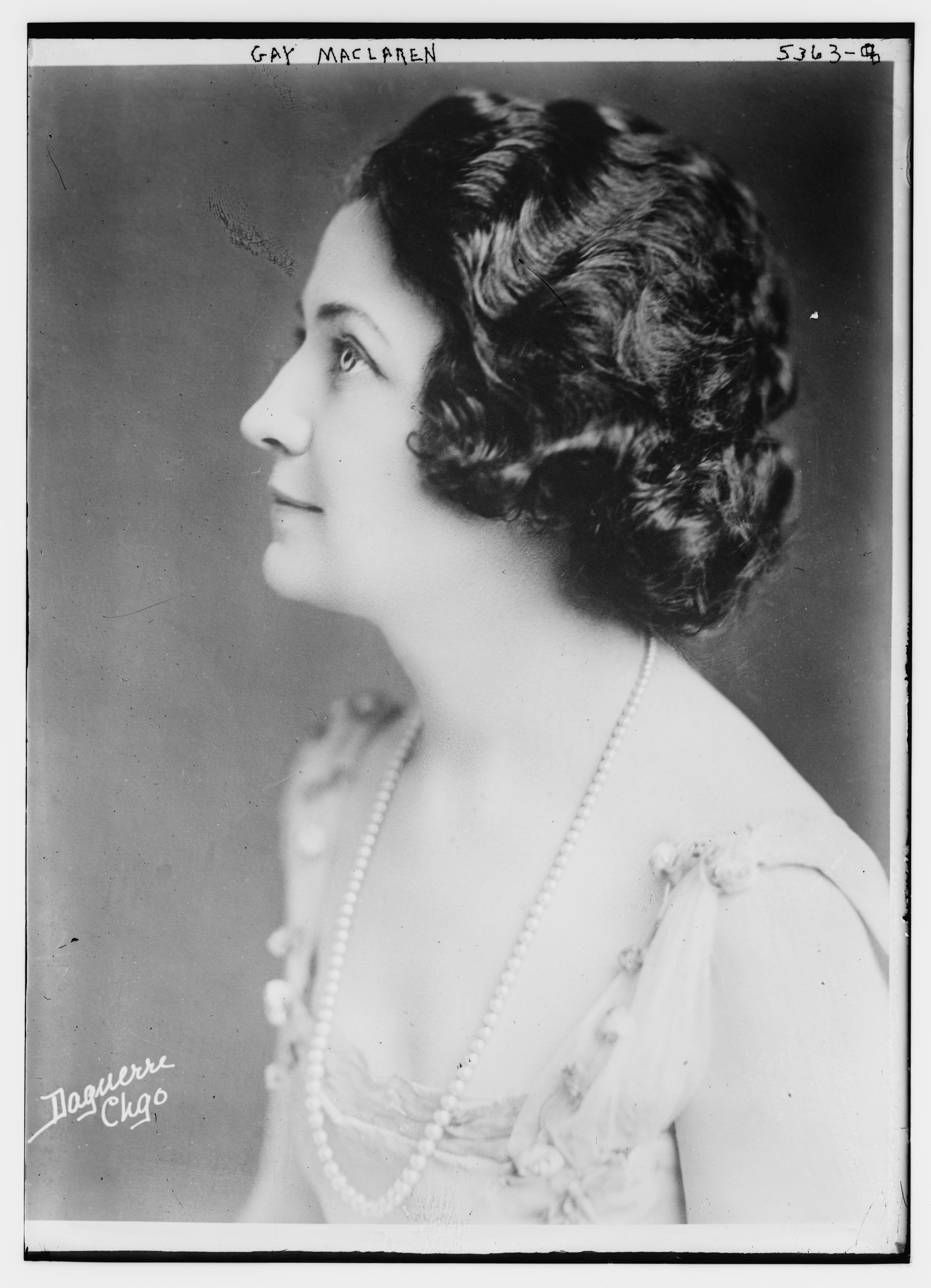
Gay MacLaren

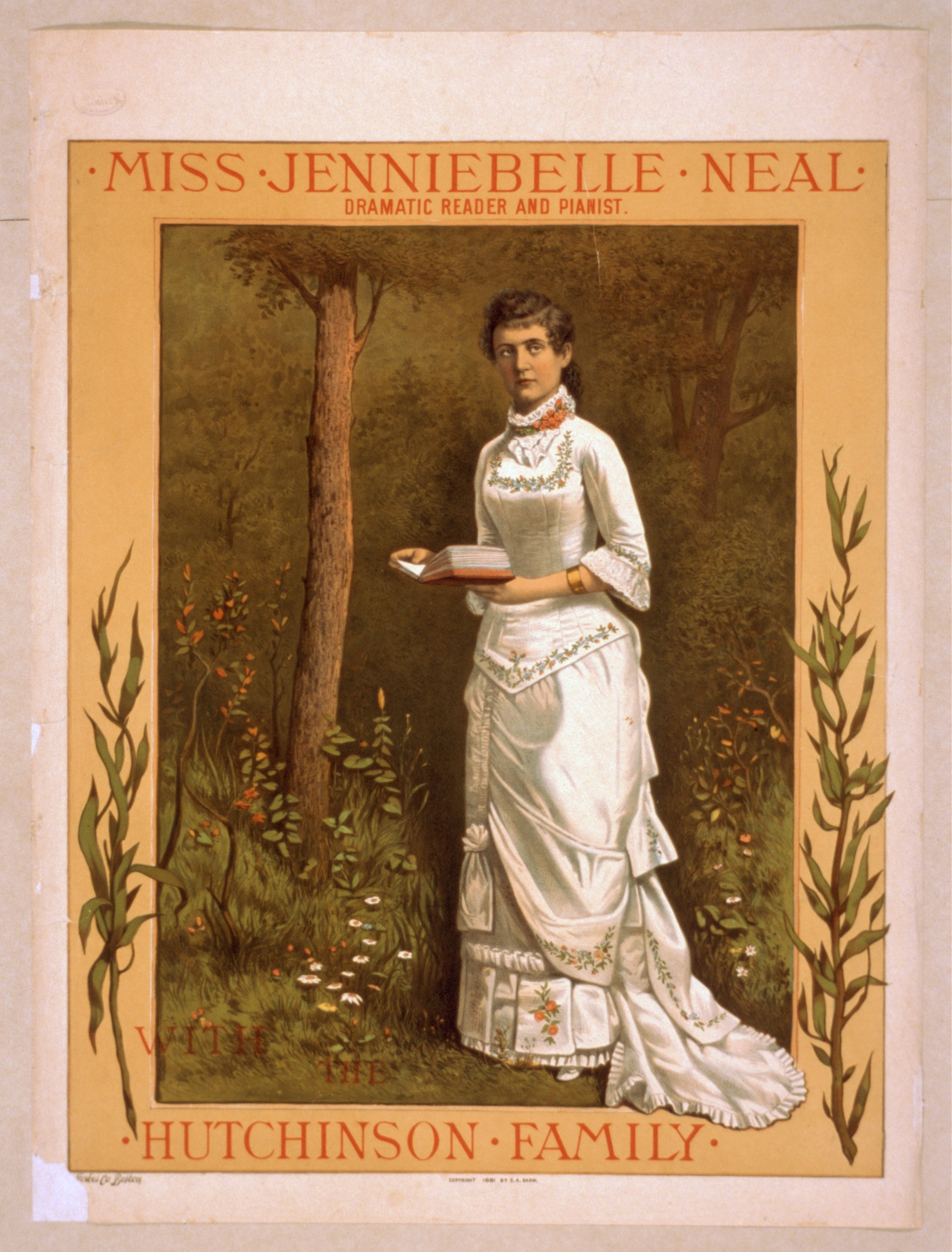
Jenniebelle Neal

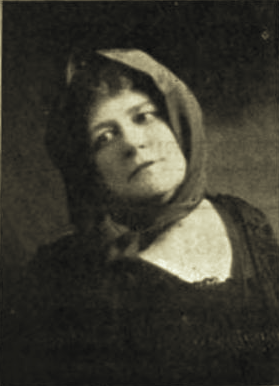
Elizabeth Martina Taber

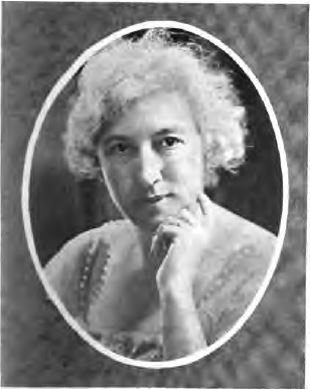
Grace Hyde Trine

== See also ==
- Table work
- Read-through
- Pre-production
- When the work is a musical Concert performance
