= Wardrobe (clothing) =

Collection of clothing belonging to or provided for an individual

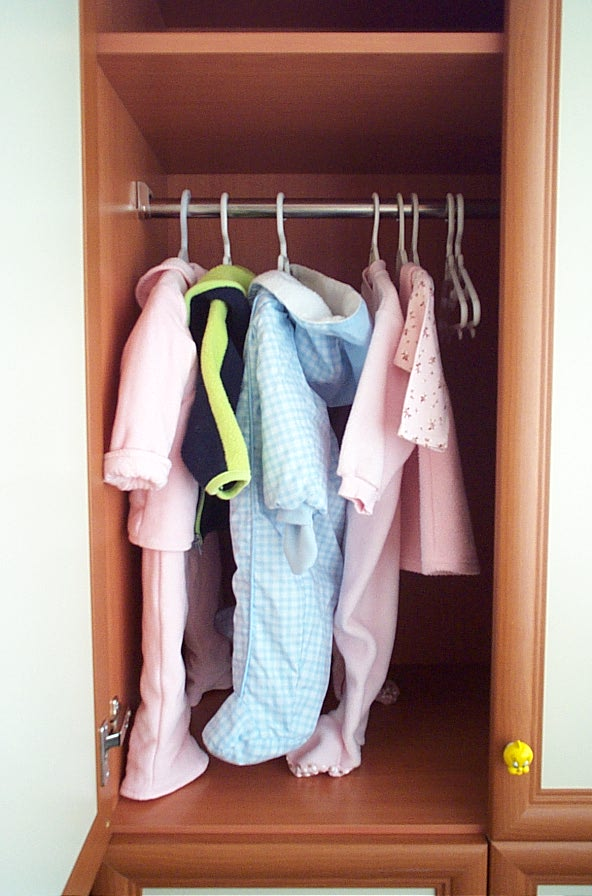
An example of clothing hanging in a wardrobe.

The term wardrobe is a metonym for the contents of a wardrobe, a freestanding piece of furniture that provides storage for clothing on pegs, rails or shelves, in drawers or on rails, or a combination of those, depending on how they are configured. A person's “wardrobe” includes every element of clothing worn, from the skin out.

== History ==
Historically, a bride's trousseau represented a new wardrobe with which to start her life as a married woman, which often meant a change in the way she dressed. Depending on the era, the place and the economic status of the bride, a trousseau was purchased or made new in anticipation of the wedding, or was acquired over the bride's lifetime, accumulated in a literal or figurative hope chest.

For example, in the 1933 film Dinner at Eight, Mrs. Jordan, a wealthy New York City socialite, complains vehemently to her daughter, who refuses to go shopping with her, that she is being married in a month and has "not a stitch of trousseau" (where trousseau refers to a wardrobe and belongings of a bride, including the wedding dress or similar clothing).

== Professional wardrobes ==
In the performing arts, the wardrobe includes the actor's costumes, shoes, undergarments, hats and costume-related personal props such as gloves, jewelry, parasols, fans and pocket books. In theater, a wardrobe supervisor is responsible for supervising all wardrobe related activities during the course of a theatrical run. A wardrobe department in film or theatrical production employs costume designers and coordinators who clothe the performers.

In the context of the performing arts, wardrobe is used to create a character's image, personality, social status and era and is an important element that brings the story to life.

== Personal wardrobes ==
A basic wardrobe is a set of timeless and fashionable pieces that form the basis of stylish and aesthetically pleasing looks for different occasions. It is a certain base from a set of clothes that can be easily combined with other elements of the basic wardrobe and new fashionable nuances attracted to your wardrobe. These are mostly clothes in neutral basic shades and simple styles. Basic wardrobe in general is designed to simplify life: with its help you will be able to create a relevant and beautiful image, without much thought, - in it clothes are easily combined with each other.

A capsule wardrobe is a minimalist wardrobe with carefully selected, versatile and durable clothing items that can be put together in many combinations. The goal is to avoid overthinking clothing choices and make it easy to choose clothes for everyday life, as well as more sustainable consumption of clothing. Depending on the style, the capsule wardrobe can be trendy, or classic and timeless. For example, it can have bright colors and a lot of prints, or more neutral colors and the absence of prints.

== See also ==
- Wardrobe stylist
- Royal Wardrobe
- Wardrobe of Mary, Queen of Scots
