= Joseph Marshall de Brett Maréchal, Baron d'Avray =

Member of the French nobility

Joseph Marshall de Brett Maréchal, Baron d'Avray (30 November 1811 – 26 November 1871) was a member of the French nobility who became an educator in the Province of New Brunswick.

Known as Marshall d'Avray, he was born in London, England and educated at the French royal court. His father, Joseph Head Marshall 1st Baron of d'Avary, received his title for his role in restoring the Bourbon dynasty in 1815. Before emigrating in 1848 to Fredericton, New Brunswick in British North America, Marshall d'Avray lived on the island of Mauritius off the coast of Africa where he founded a normal school.

In Fredericton he was appointed the first principal of the Provincial Normal School, serving in that capacity until 1850. In 1852 he was made professor of modern languages at King's College, retaining that position until his death in 1871, four days before his 60th birthday.

Marshall d'Avray served as the province's superintendent of education from 1854 to 1858, during which time he was also the Editor of the Fredericton newspaper, Headquarters.
