= Nan Macpherson Smith =

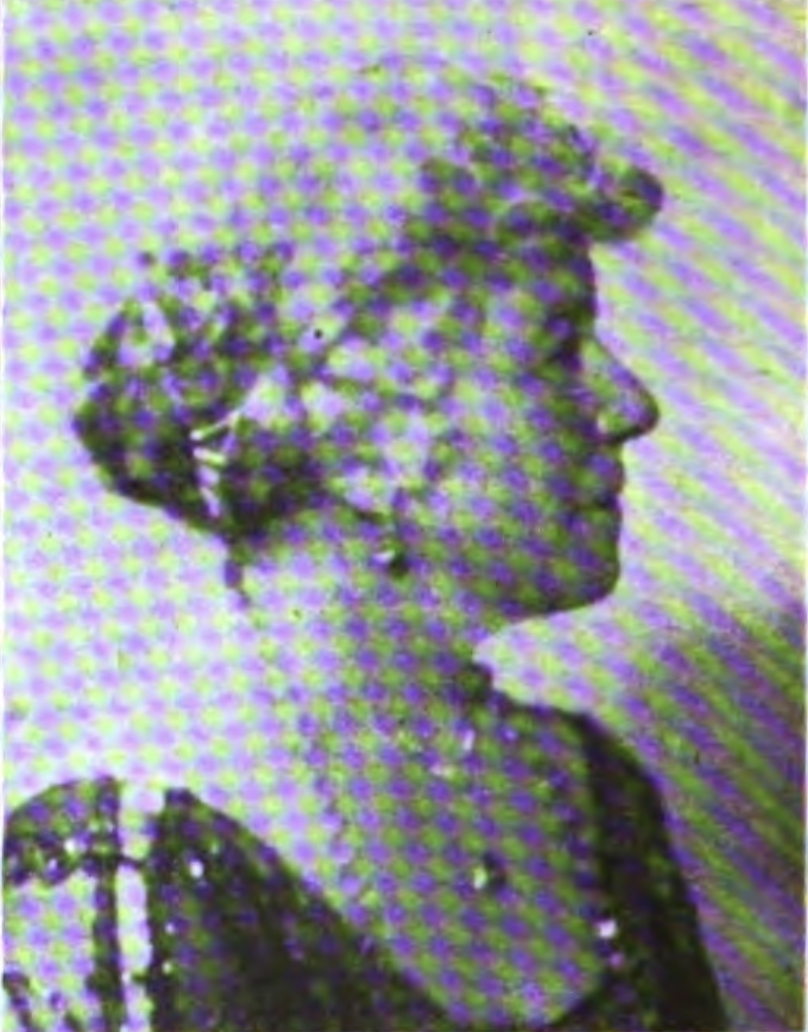
- Smith in a 1925 publication
- Born: Nancy E. MacPherson Robinson; Campbellton, New Brunswick, Canada
- Died: August 27, 1940; Saint Andrews, New Brunswick
- Other name: Mrs. E. Atherton Smith
- Education: Mount Allison Academy; Boston School of Oratory; New Brunswick Teachers' College
- Occupations: leader; philanthropist
- Spouse: Edward Atherton (m. 1890; died 1925)
- Awards: Queen Elizabeth of Belgium Medal

Nan Macpherson Smith (née, Robinson; after marriage, Mrs. E. Atherton Smith, d. 1940) was a Canadian leader in New Brunswick women's activities, as well as patriotic, philanthropic, cultural, missionary, and benevolent projects in the Saint John area. She was well known as a writer, organizer and public speaker, with a national reputation as a lecturer on literary subjects and travel. Elevating womanhood, she traveled throughout Canada and the United States. She was also known for her war work during World War I.

== Early life and education ==
Nancy E. MacPherson Robinson was born at "Maple Grove" in Campbellton. Her parents were John Robinson and Mary Масpherson, both of Restigouche County, New Brunswick.

She was educated at Mount Allison Academy in Sackville (M.L.A.), Boston School of Oratory, and the New Brunswick Teachers' College (teacher's certificate).

== Career ==
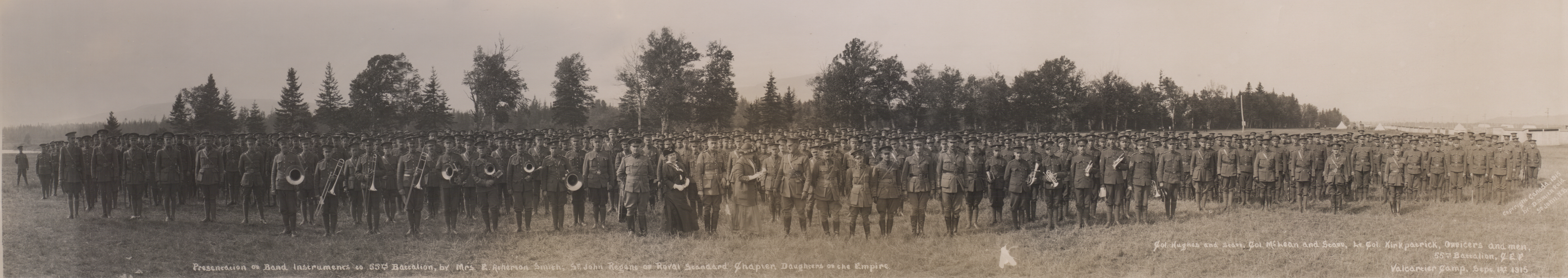
Presentation of band instruments to 55th Battalion by Smith, St. John Regent of Royal Standard Chapter, IODE, Valcartier Camp, Sept. 1, 1915

Smith was a Life Member of the Imperial Order Daughters of the Empire (IODE). She served as Regent, Royal Standard Chapter, IODE for five years and also Provincial Organizing Secretary, IODΕ for three years. In 1915, during World War I, Smith, then St. John Regent of Royal Standard Chapter, IODE, equipped and sent overseas a band with the Canadian Expeditionary Force.

Smith served as president, Provincial National Council of Women of Canada; also vice-president for New Brunswick in National Council of Women of Canada; and Life Member of the National Council of Women of Canada. She was a representative of the International Council of Women at international conferences (Washington, 1925; Geneva, 1927; Vienna, 1930).

Smith held several other leadership positions including: President of the Women's Hospital Aid, which had over 2,000 members; President, New Brunswick Auxiliary for the Blind; President of the Ladies' Curling Club of St. John; President, Women's Canadian Club for five years (1909–14); and vice-president of Association of Canadian Clubs.

She served as Commissioner of the Free Public Library, Commissioner of the Saint John County Hospital, Governor of the Board of St. John Health Centre, and Governor of the Boys' Industrial Home;.

She was an Associate Member of the Royal Colonial Institute, London, England; Member, Free Dispensary Board; Member, Board of Children's Aid Society; Member, Board of Provincial Red Cross, and Member, Executive Committee, Maritime School for the Blind in Halifax, Nova Scotia.

== Personal life ==
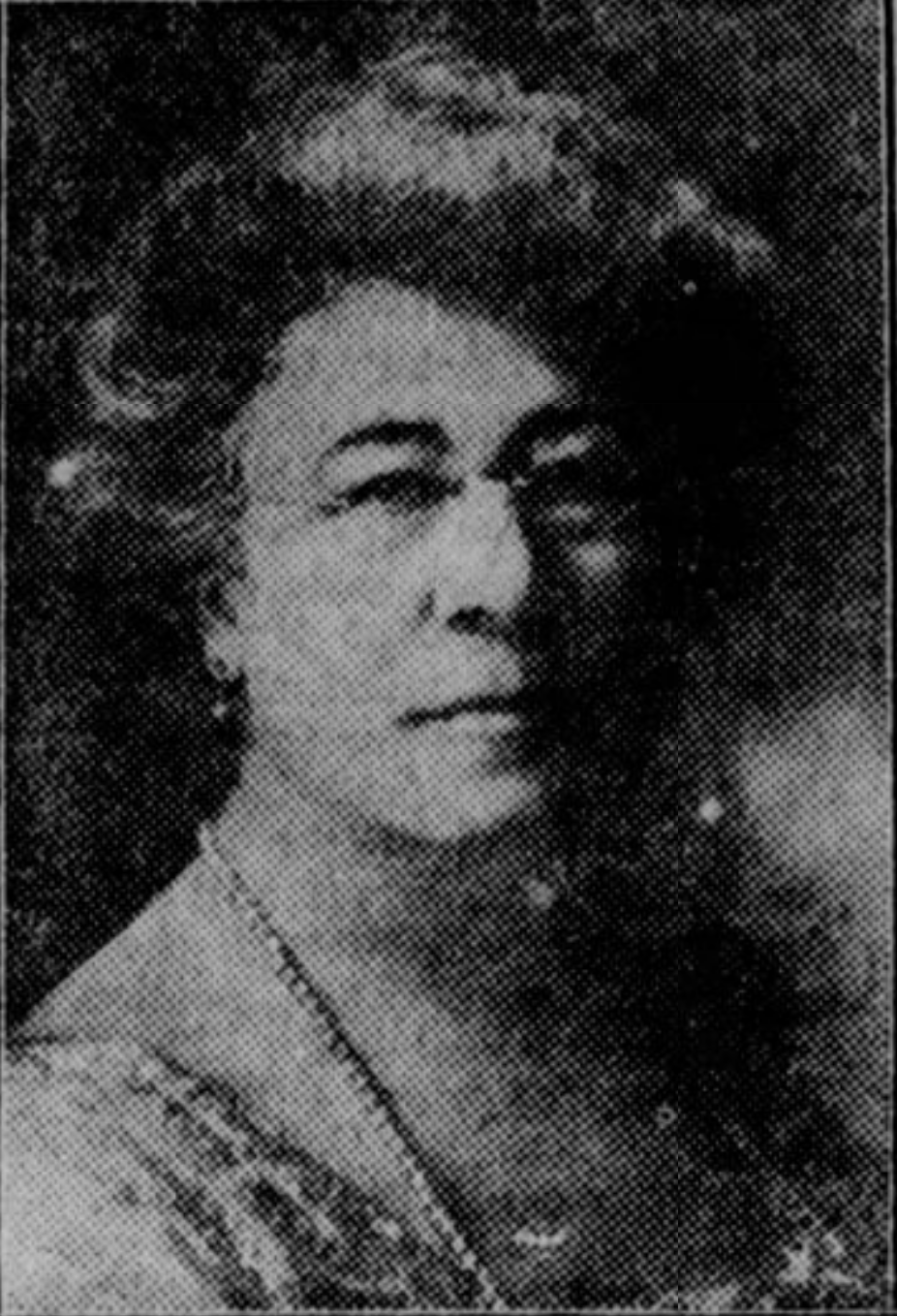
Smith in 1925

In 1890, she married Edward Atherton Smith (d. 1925), head of Smith Brokerage Company. The couple had no children.

Smith made her primary home at "Cluneleigh", Saint Andrews; there was a second home in Saint John. In religion, she belonged to Saint Andrew's Church, in Saint John. Her recreations included yachting, motoring, golf, curling and travel.

Mr. and Mrs. Smith were amongst the first Canadians to travel around the world, having made that cruise on the Empress of Canada in 1924.

== Death and legacy ==
After an illness of only a couple of hours, Nan Macpherson Smith died at "Cluneleigh", St. Andrews, on August 27, 1940.

The Nan MacPherson Smith prize was created by the Women's Canadian Club in her honor.

== Awards and honours ==
- Honored in being the first Canadian woman to welcome the Prince of Wales on the occasion of his arrival in Saint John, 1919
- Queen Elizabeth of Belgium Medal, decorated by King Albert of Belgium for service to his country
