= Sarah Lord Bailey =

British-born American elocutionist and teacher of dramatic elocution

Sarah Lord Bailey Sanborn
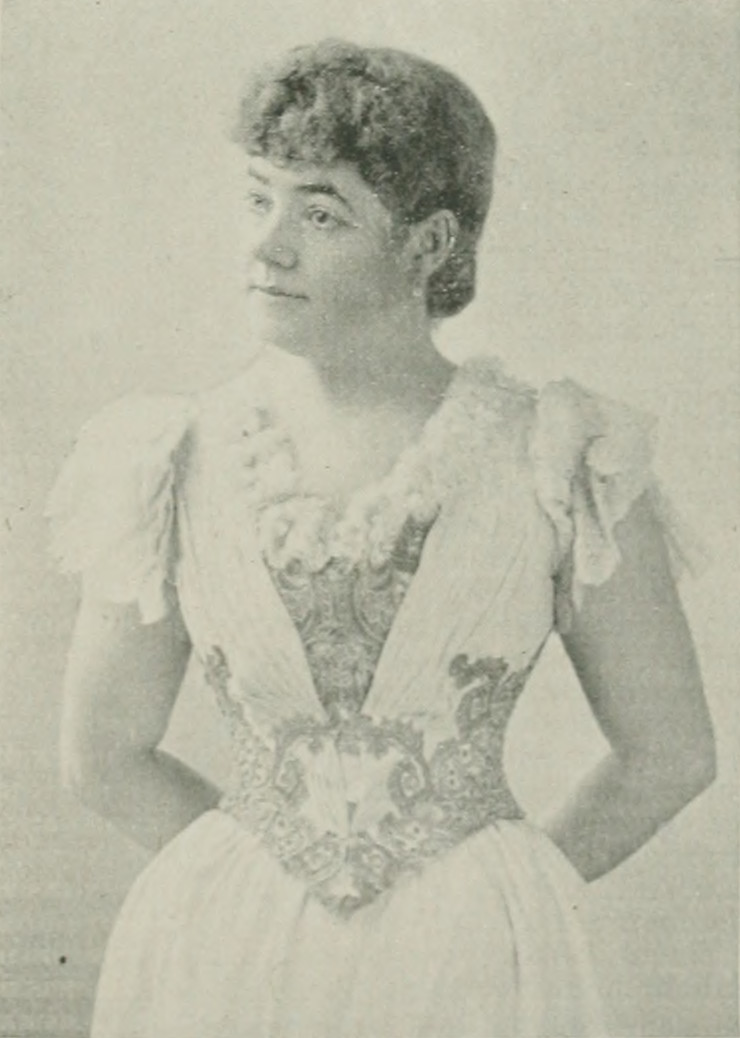
- Photo in A Woman of the Century
- Born: Sarah Lord; September 9, 1856; Tottington, Metropolitan Borough of Bury, England
- Died: July 9, 1922 (aged 65); Haverhill, Massachusetts, U.S.
- Other name: Sarah Lord Sanborn
- Occupations: elocutionist; teacher of dramatic elocution
- Notable work: Work and Art, 1898

Sarah Lord Bailey (née, Lord; after first marriage, Bailey; after second marriage, Sanborn; September 9, 1856 – July 9, 1922) was a British-born American elocutionist and teacher of dramatic elocution. Born in Tottington, England, she moved with her parents to Lawrence, Massachusetts, as an infant and was educated there and in Auburndale before pursuing advanced studies in elocution in Boston. She spent time in the Sandwich Islands before returning to the United States, where she taught in Missouri and later in Massachusetts. Over the course of her career, she conducted classes, gave public readings, published a textbook on elocution, and was active as both a teacher and performer in multiple cities.

== Early life and education ==
Sarah Ellen Lord was born in Tottington, Metropolitan Borough of Bury, England, 9 September 1856. She was the only child of Daniel Lord (1834-1911) and his wife, Alice (nee, Warburton; 1836-1914). Mr. and Mrs. Lord brought Sarah to the U.S. the year following her birth, making their home in Lawrence, Massachusetts.

Early in life, she showed a fondness and talent for dramatic elocution, and it was developed by her participation in amateur plays given in Lawrence under the auspices of the Grand Army of the Republic posts. She was educated in the Oliver grammar school, and the Lasell Seminary (now Lasell University), where she studied two years. She afterwards studied under the best teachers of elocution in Boston, and was graduated in 1888 from the Boston School of Oratory. She was a pupil of Howard M. Ticknor.

== Career ==
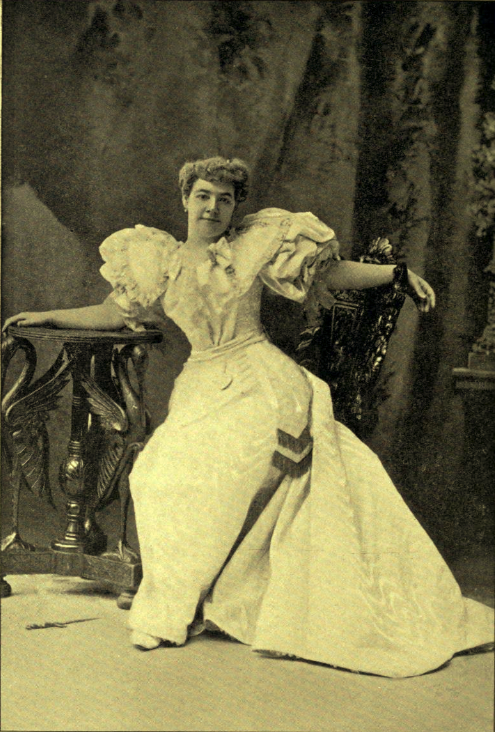
(1898)

In Boston, August 23, 1877, she married Elbridge E. Bailey (1846-1899). In 1883, to benefit Mr. Bailey's health, they went to the Sandwich Islands where they lived for nearly two years. They were present at the coronation ceremonies of King Kalākaua and Queen Kapiʻolani in ʻIolani Palace, February 12, 1883.

In 1884, they returned to the U.S., and Mr. Bailey went into business in St. Louis, Missouri, where Mrs. Bailey taught elocution in the Missouri School for the Blind. They afterwards removed to Kansas City, Missouri where Mr. Bailey built up a flourishing business. For some time, Mrs. Bailey taught elocution and voice-culture in the Kansas City School of Elocution and Oratory.

She was obliged to return to Massachusetts on account of her failing health. In Lawrence, she conducted several large classes in elocution, besides fulfilling engagements to read in various cities.

In October 1891, she read at the Toronto Auditorium. In 1898, she published, Work and Art. The textbook included a series of exercises for use by classes or for self instruction.

On May 11, 1901, she married Jack Sanborn (1861-1930).

== Death ==
Sarah Lord Bailey Sanborn died of stomach cancer in Haverhill, Massachusetts, July 9, 1922.

== Selected works ==
Work and art

- Work and Art, 1898

== Gallery ==
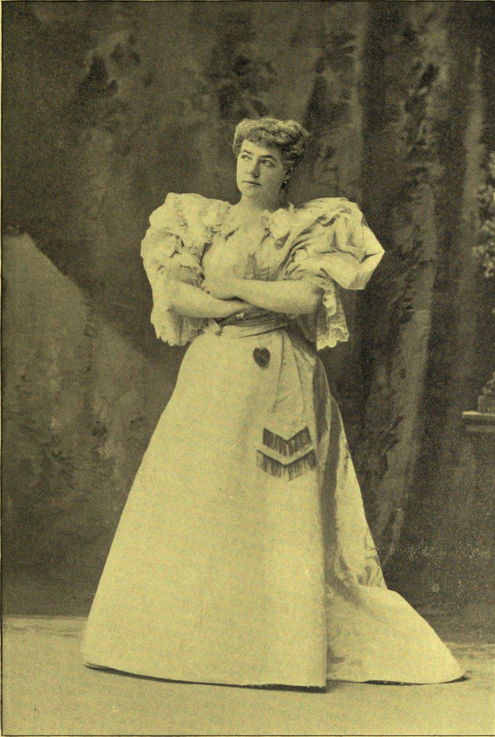
"Defiance" pose

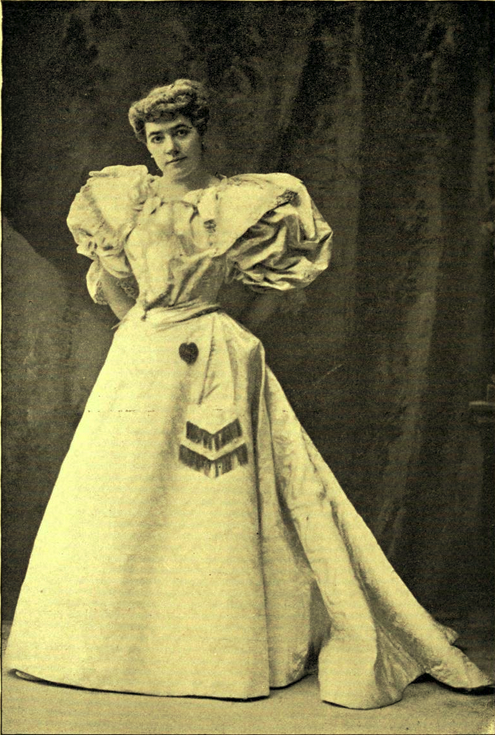
"Reflection" pose

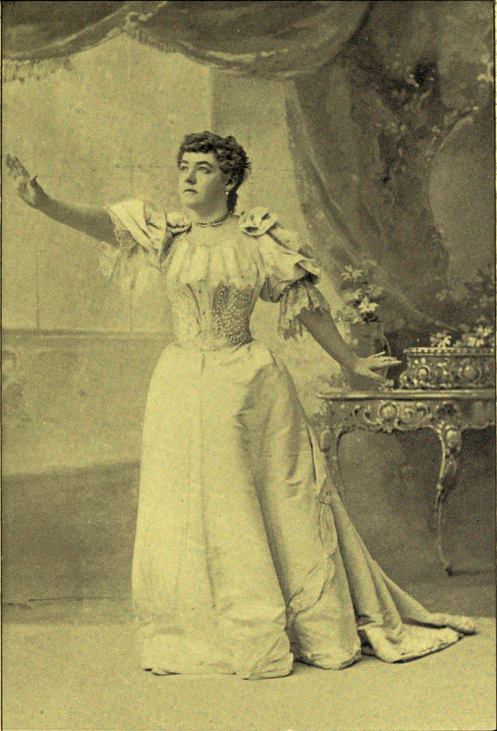
"Repulsion" pose

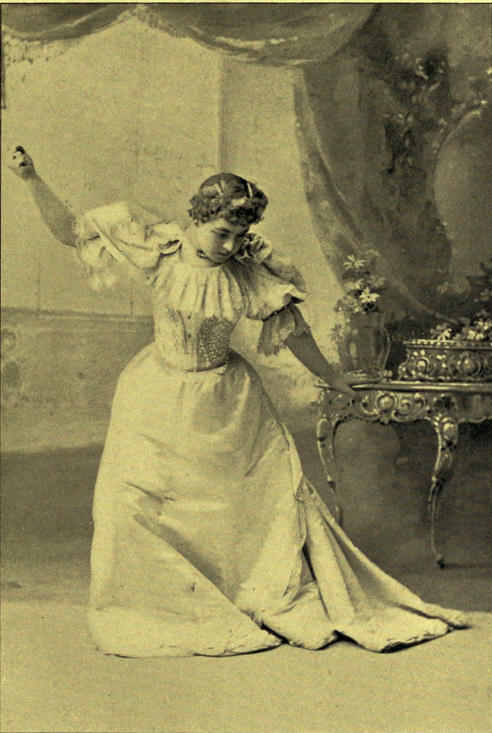
"Vehemence" pose
