= Bullet hit squib =

Device for simulating a gunshot wound

Pyrotechnic squibs blow open "bullet holes", bursting smoke and fake blood through the actor's jacket in an exaggerated special effects demonstration.

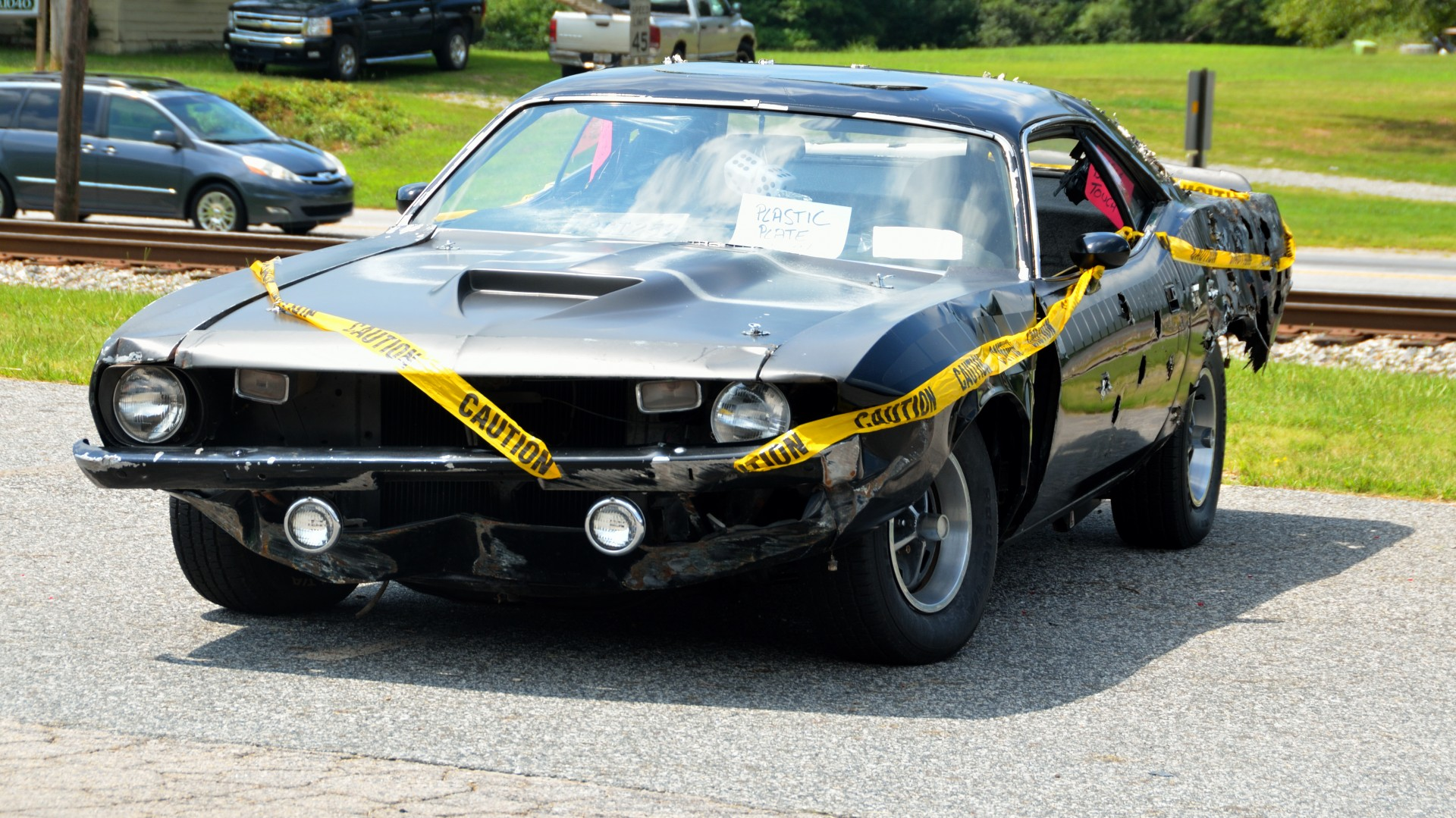
A stunt car with bullet holes drilled out on its panels for squib placement.

A bullet hit squib is a pyrotechnic, practical special effect device used in filmmaking, television and theatre to simulate the appearance of a person or an object being shot. When used on an actor as a blood squib, an explosive charge ruptures the costume and fake blood packet, expelling its contents through the resulting hole. Devices used similarly on props, such as walls and cars, blow out predrilled, filled and painted holes.

For blood hits, the device comprises a squib, simulants sealed in a bag imitating bodily fluids, tissues or both, a protective shield and padding. The device is usually concealed in specially prepared clothing and weakened at the effect location, instead of on bare skin.

The squib is connected to a power source and a remote, detonated by the actor or a crew member to achieve the effect. Multiple squibs may be used and triggered either simultaneously or sequentially to represent different types of gunfire.

While used for dramatic effect to illustrate the demise of a character, the visual result does not accurately reflect the physical characteristics of real gunshot wounds. Nevertheless, the stylised and exaggerated aesthetic is widely recognised by filmmakers and audiences alike, such as in the main figure, bullet holes are blown outwards and blood projects through the entire jacket.

== Historical context, usage and development ==
A puff of gray smoke blasts from a small squib hit explosive in actor Thomas Mitchell's on-screen 'death' in Bataan (1943).

=== From early to modern day use ===
Bullet hit squibs were first used in the film industry as early as 1943 in Bataan, as shown in the adjacent image, and 1955 in Pokolenie, with the latter using fake blood added in a condom and a squib, a technique still widely in use today. The use of squibs in filmmaking has become a widely accepted and well-established technique for creating convincing and realistic depictions of violence. This approach has been used in many classic films such as The Matrix (1999), Goodfellas (1990), and The Terminator (1984).

Despite advances in digital effects, practical squibs are still widely used due to their ability to produce authentic, in-camera effects that enhance the overall atmosphere and intensity of a scene. While CGI can be employed to augment or replace squib effects in certain situations, the physicality and immediacy of practical squibs continue to make them a valuable tool in special effects for film and television. Bullet hit squibs can also be used in first responder moulage training and music videos, for example 99 Problems (2004).

=== Related advancements ===
The earliest patent related to the manufacturing and chemical composition of bullet hit squibs was submitted in 1991. Since then, from the 2000s, a number of notable design or manufacturing features have been patented. Advancements include specific methods and chemical compositions to manufacture the squibs themselves, such as without heavy metals; a wearable, reusable pneumatic system that eliminates the need for explosives by using compressed air to expel fake blood through a small outlet. Another design incorporates traditional squibs but is pre-manufactured and nearly fully assembled, reducing on-set assembly time. This standardised design, however, limits customisation in terms of blood volume, spray pattern, etc.

== Device and costume preparation and implementation ==
In film productions, multiple crew members, including pyrotechnicians and costume designers, work together to create the effect. Pyrotechnicians are responsible for building the squibs, while costume designers prepare multiple identical outfits for the actors. Collaboration among writers, directors, producers, and actors is essential for determining the number and placement of squibs, as well as costume design. Depending on the budget, productions typically use between three and six, and sometimes eight costumes to accommodate various takes, camera angles, out of sequence filming, dress rehearsals, backups and tests. This can become costly, especially for low-budget filmmakers, leading to trade-offs between the number of character deaths, takes (i.e. costume duplicates), and the number of squibs (i.e. multiple hits) used. An overview of the device and costume preparation is illustrated in the gallery below.

Bullet hit squib assembly

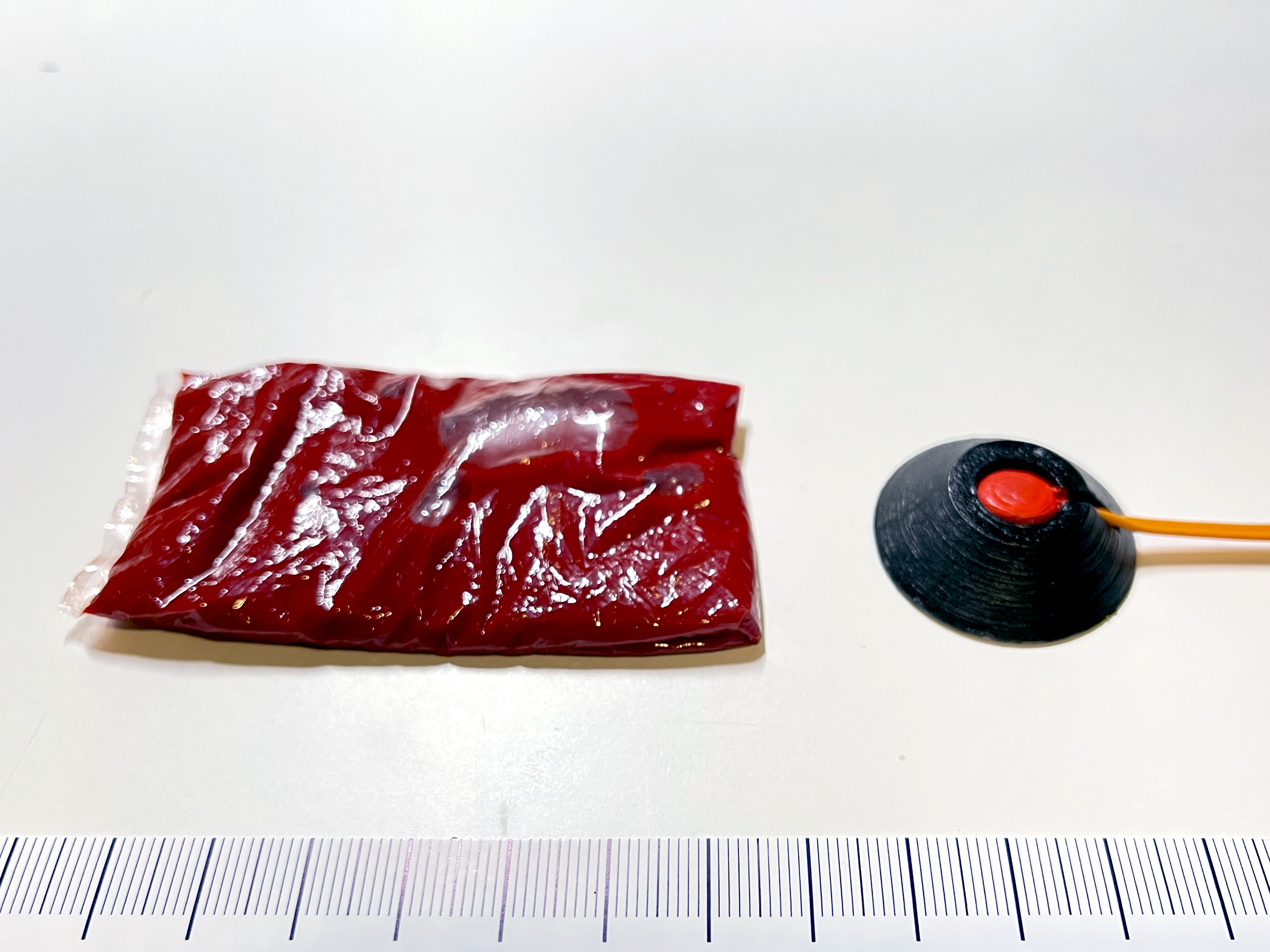
A 15 g packet of fake blood next to a 0.5 grain squib with a solid polycarbonate shield.

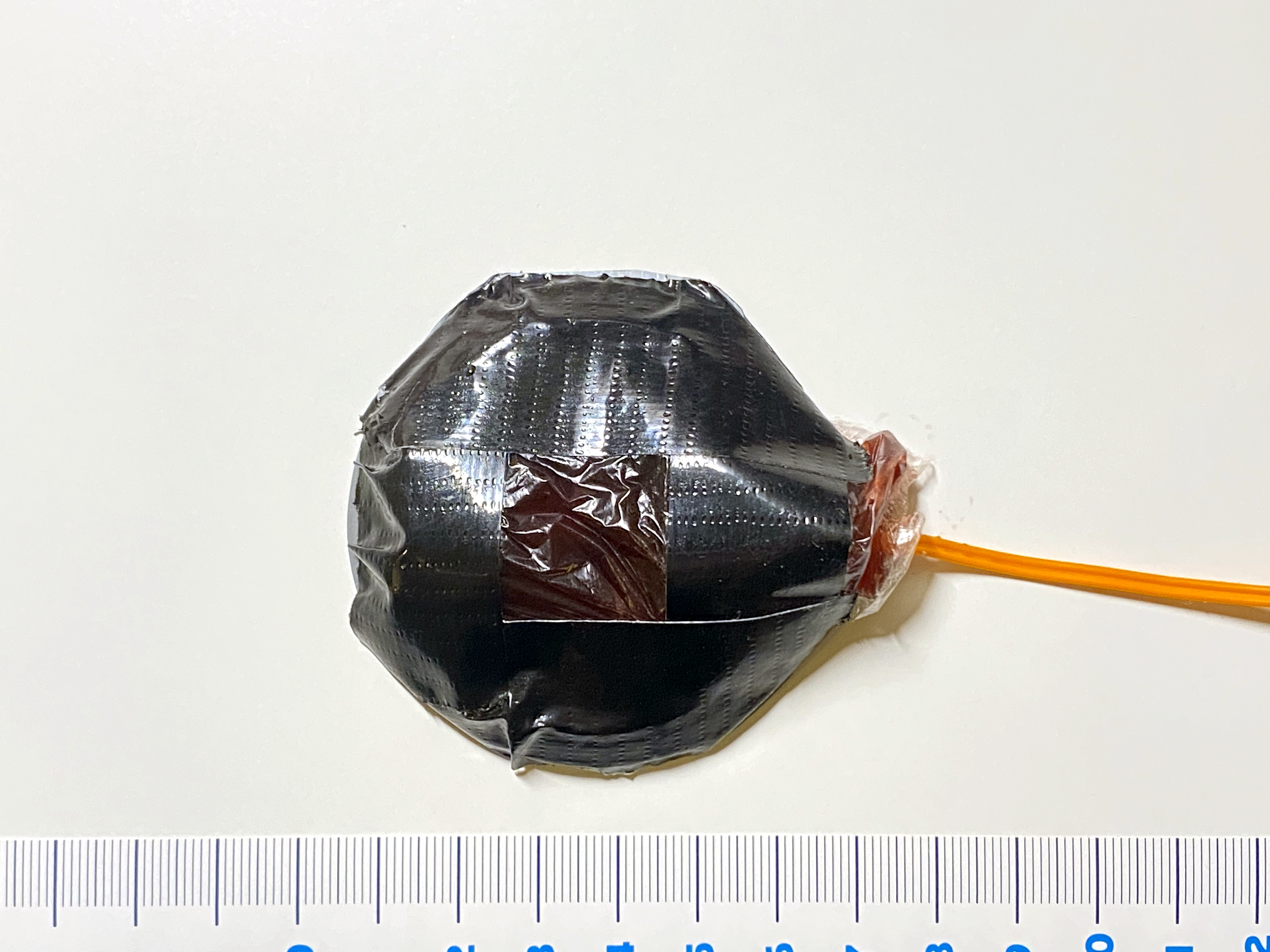
A bullet hit squib device with approx. 25 g of fake blood in a plastic pouch, assembled with duct tape.

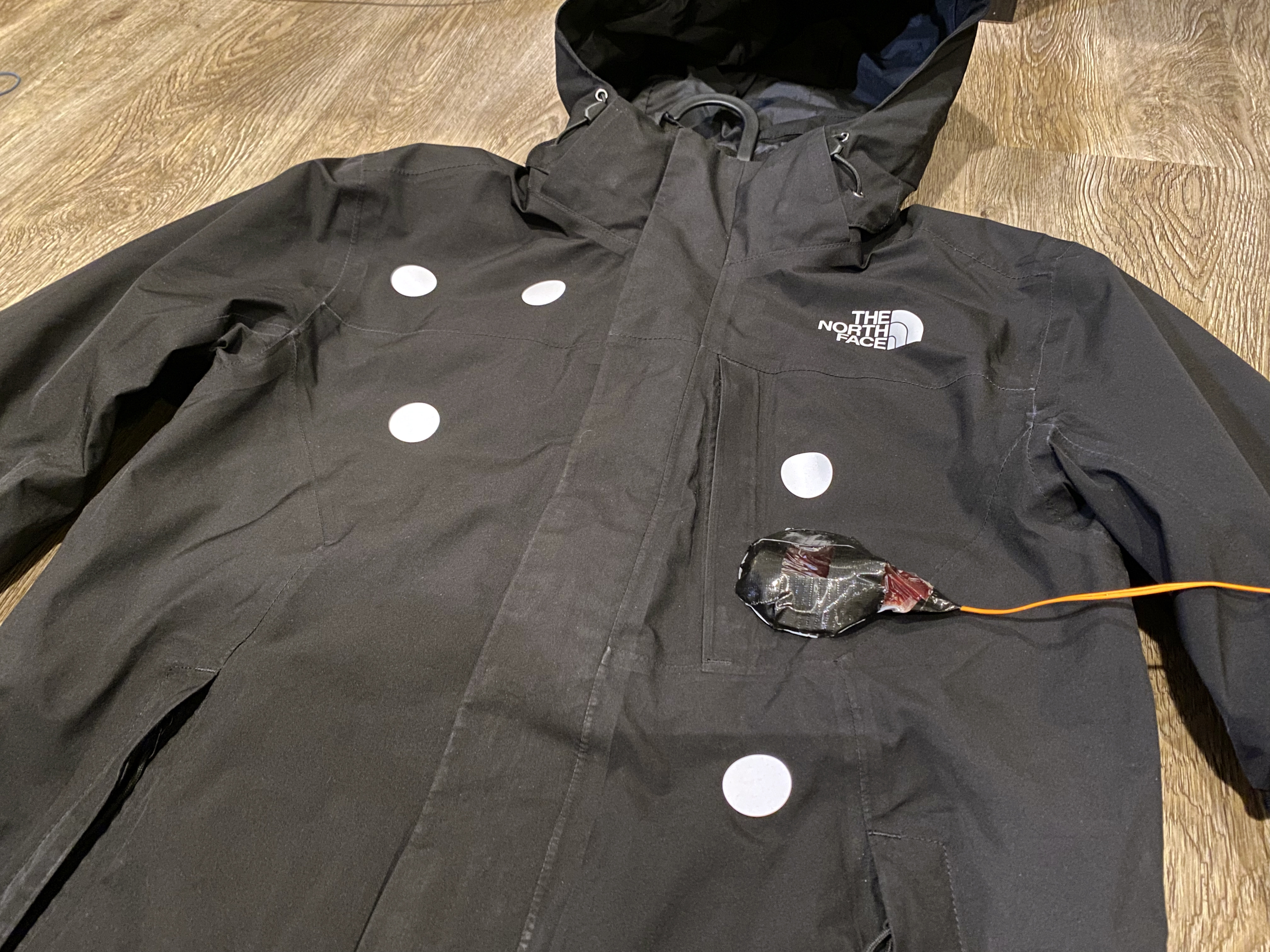
Bullet hit locations marked out with white stickers. An assembled device is placed temporarily on the costume for reference.

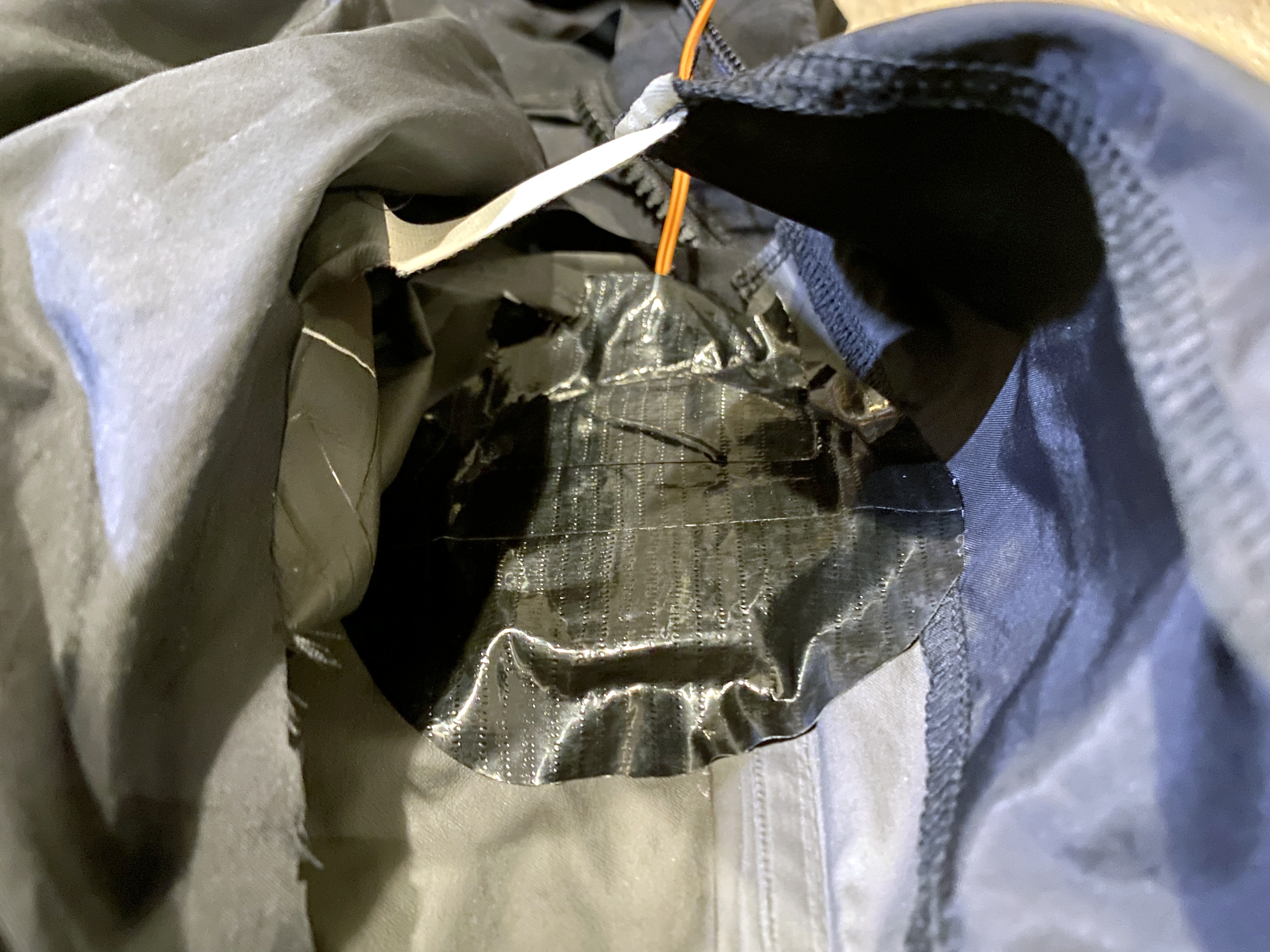
The inner taffeta lining cut open, where the device is aligned to the hole and secured with duct tape.

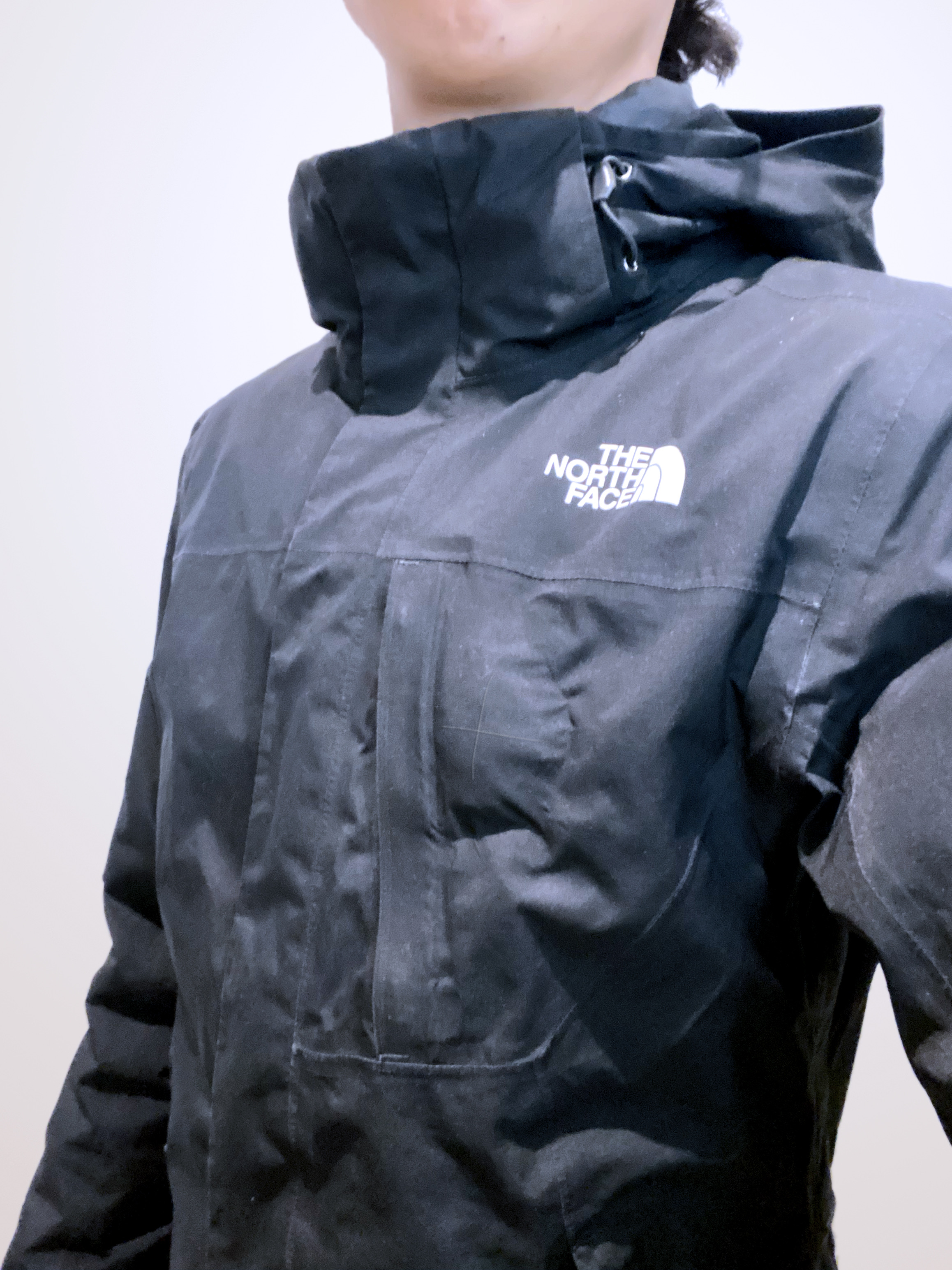
The view from the outside where the squib is aligned subtly with a prescored cross.

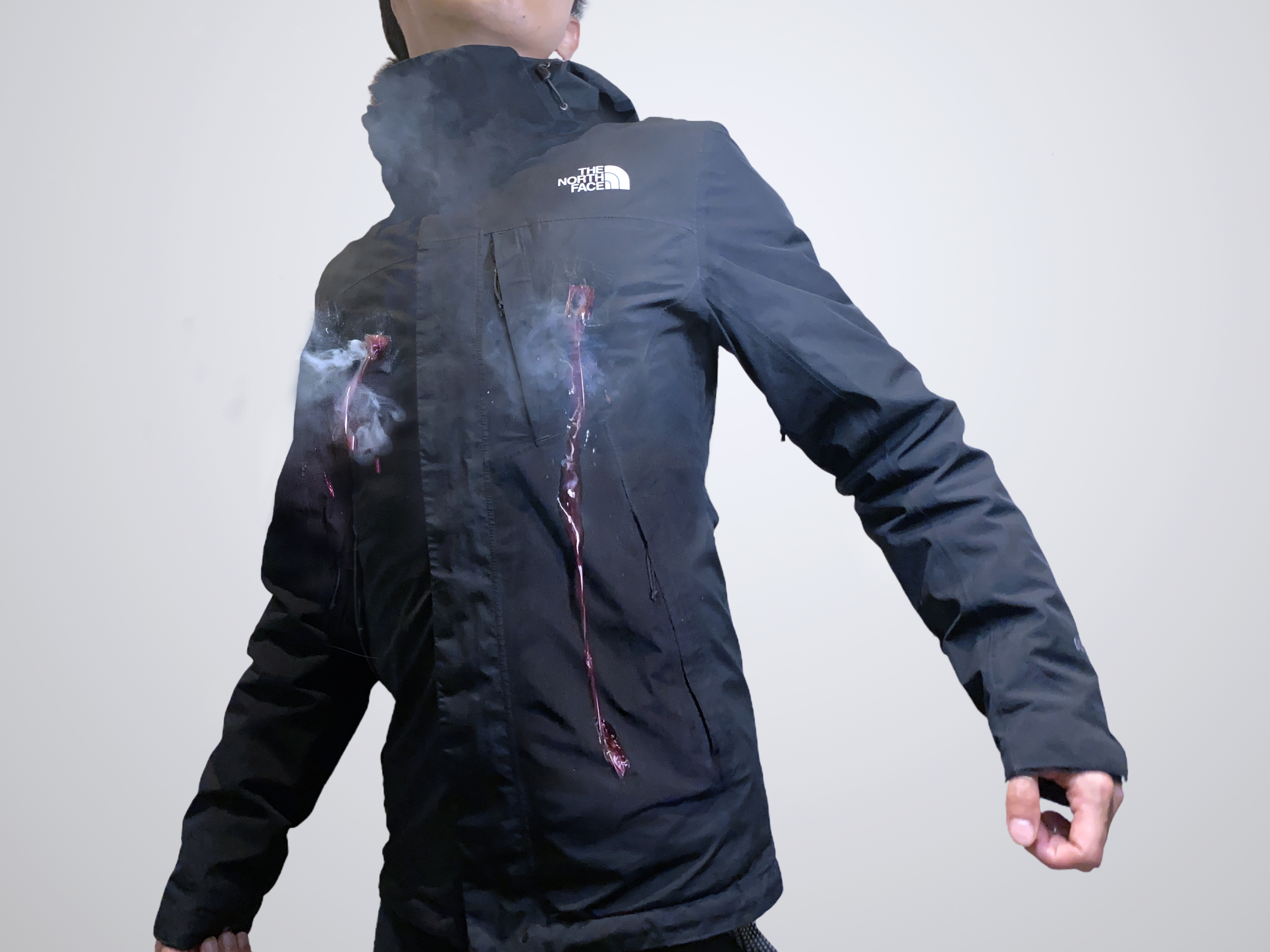
Blood squib devices being triggered.

=== Bullet hit squib device ===
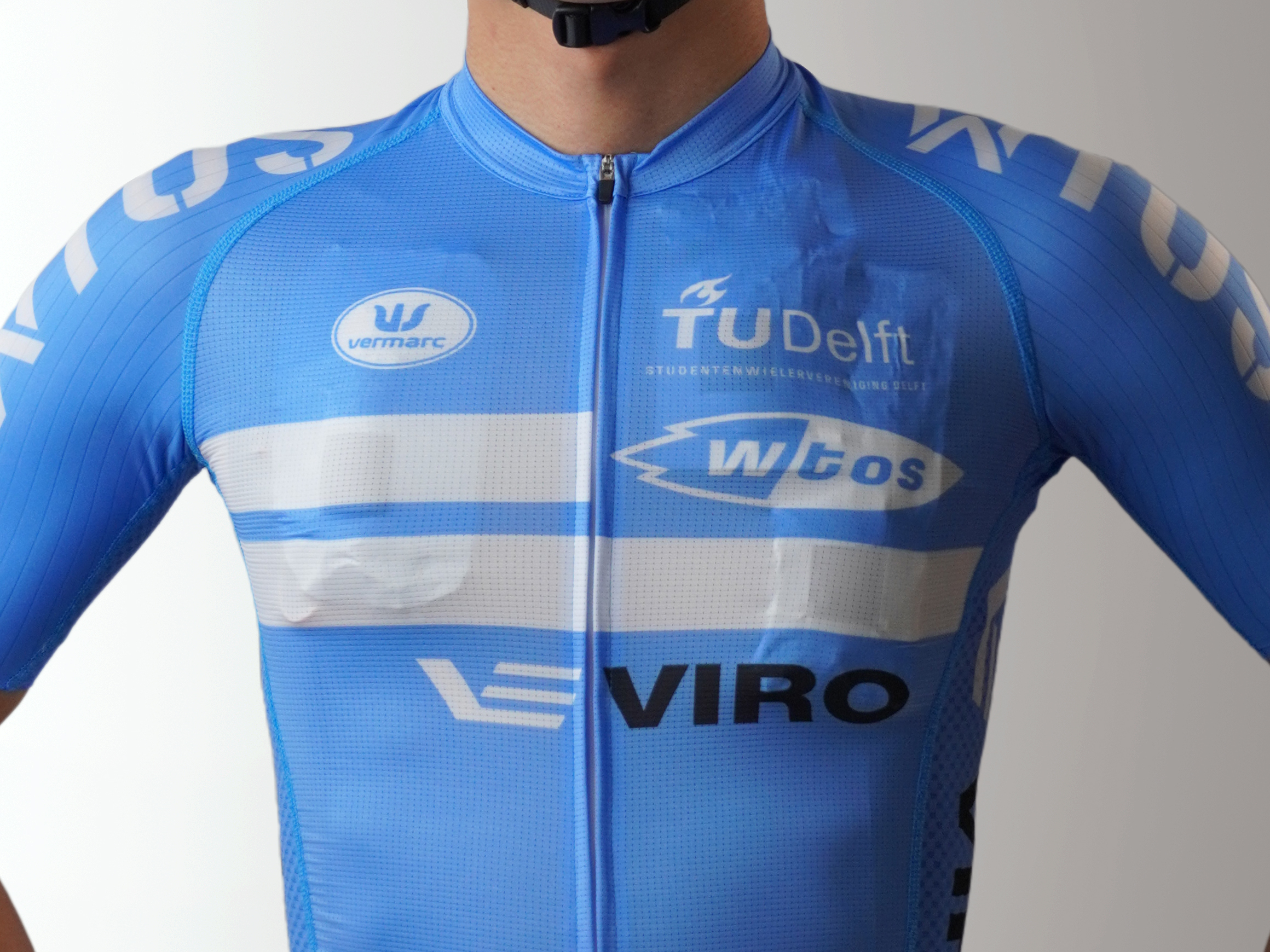
Three bullet hit squib devices attached beneath the cycling jersey on the chest area can be seen that the pack opening (where the squib is located) is aligned at the lower end.

The desired aesthetic of the blood hit is usually first decided, for example, an entry or exit wound, i.e. fake blood erupting as a gushing stream or a spray of fine mist respectively, and the absorbency of the costume fabric determine the amount to be used, typically 10–30 ml. It is typically filled in a small balloon, packet, or condom, followed by a grooved protective plate and padding. The positioning of the squib above or below the blood pack enables the burst to be customised. For example, placing the squib beneath and aligning it to the lower half of the blood pack oriented vertically produces an aerosolised burst followed by a stream, as shown in the adjacent figure.

These parameters and the fabric strength then determine the squib size. The actual squib is a flat, disc-shaped high explosive, containing an integrated igniter or glow wire, about 0.5–2 mm thick and weighing between 2 and 384 mg, Usually, the smallest possible grain size to achieve the effect is used, although the most common variants are 0.5 and 1.0 grain (33 to 65 mg). For comparison, a low explosive party popper is approximately 0.25 grains (15 mg), and a small firecracker is about 2.5 grains (150 mg).

A low profile is intended during the assembly to minimise bulge through the costume. The device is secured with duct tape, leaving a small front window for the simulant to burst through. Various fluids, such as fake blood, water (rehearsals), glycerine (night scenes), and/or solids like dust and feathers (gunshot aesthetic on a down jacket), cotton or meat are used depending on the desired effect. A complete bullet hit squib assembly weighs approximately 50 g, measuring 100x50 mm in length and width and 25 mm thick.

=== Costume considerations for blood squib effects ===
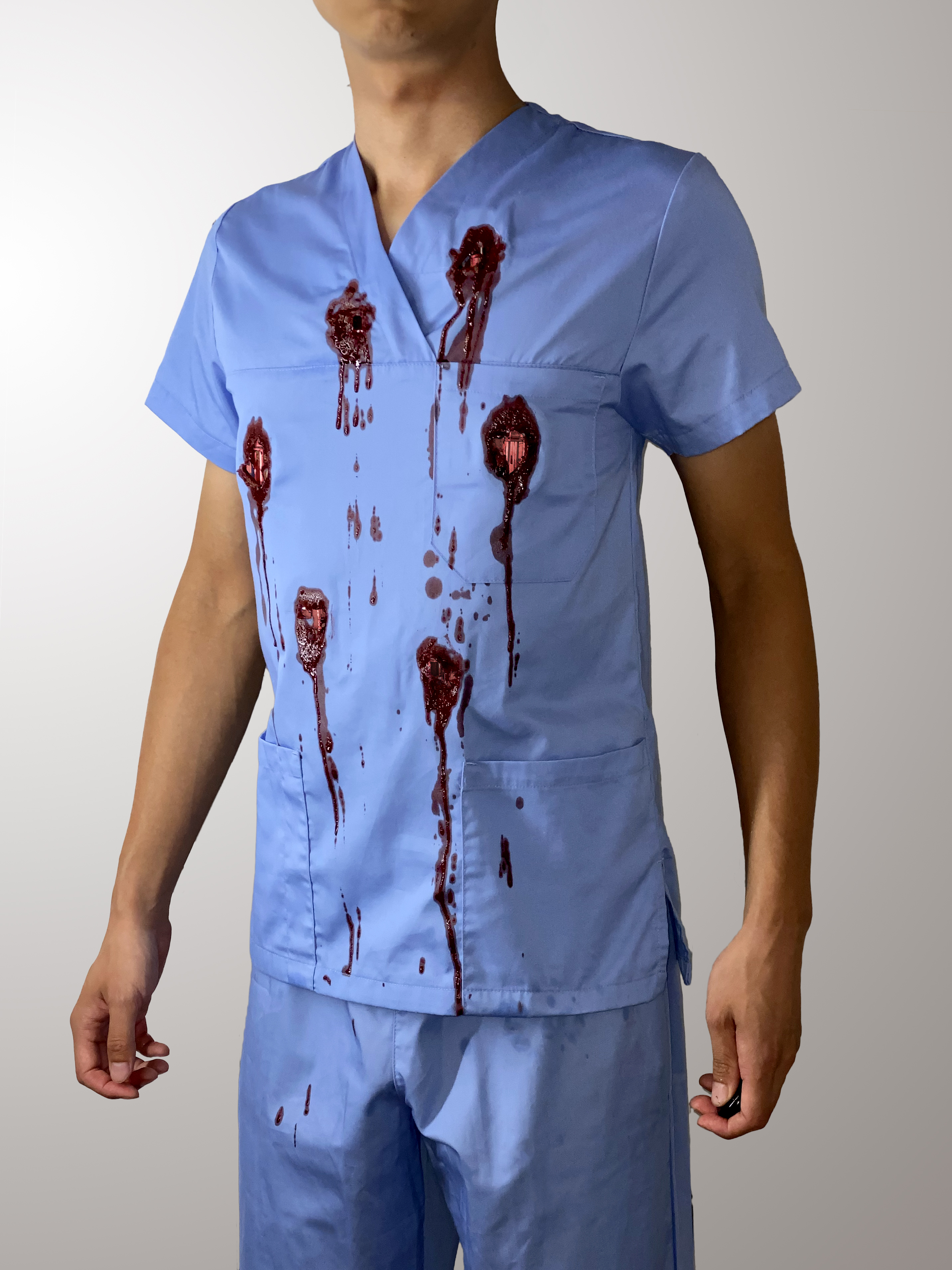
Behind-the-scenes look of an actor wearing scrubs as the stunt costume for a movie with six blown open "bullet holes" and fake blood stains.

Stage clothes modified for actors playing characters killed on screen are modified to conceal special effects equipment such as squibs and wiring, such as the holed and bloodied scrub top shown in the adjacent image. When preparing these costumes, considerations include script and scene requirements, how easily squibs can be integrated, hidden and seen before and after triggering respectively, aesthetics, lighting conditions and budget constraints. As a result, they play an important role as a figurative canvas, portraying violence and death through bursts of blood, frayed bullet holes and the stains. For gunshot wounds depicted on bare skin, prosthetics may be used instead. Several "distress doubles" or "stunt" costumes with pre-scored bullet holes are usually prepared for main characters to accommodate multiple takes and camera angles. These copies may be a size or two larger to cover for the additional equipment and padding. Additionally, a "hero" or "picture" costume is used for earlier scenes and close-ups without squibs.

=== Preparation and integration ===
Squibs are discreetly integrated into costumes to minimise visibility on screen, with examples shown in the gallery beneath. The fabric is intentionally weakened using techniques such as cutting, sanding, scoring, grating or plunging a scoring tool producing a crosshatch pattern, often required by health and safety legislation and loosely glued or taped back together. Small incisions in the fabric without actually cutting through it can reduce the visibility of scoring marks. Squib placement is kept consistent across all stunt costumes. To ensure that the fake blood is propelled outwards, squibs are aligned with precut bullet holes and securely attached. They are connected to a wired or wireless trigger, power source, and sometimes a programmable controller for synchronisation. The electronics can be placed within the costume or off-camera. Test fires and rehearsals are performed to check for faults and to make adjustments to timing or the amount of fake blood as needed.

Bulge visibility of bullet hit squibs embedded in tight and loose fitting clothing (labelled)

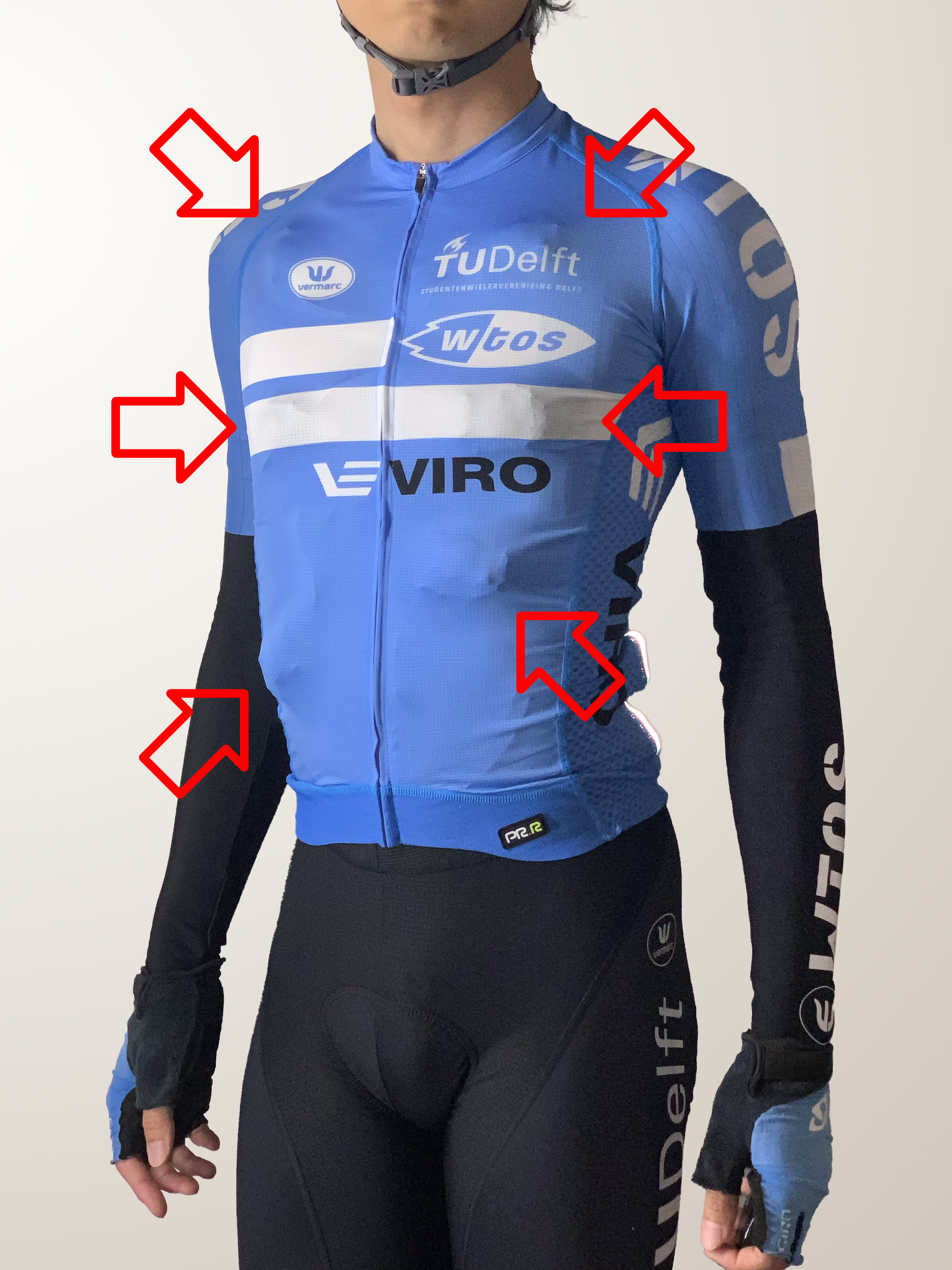
15 g of fake blood in each device beneath a cycling jersey.

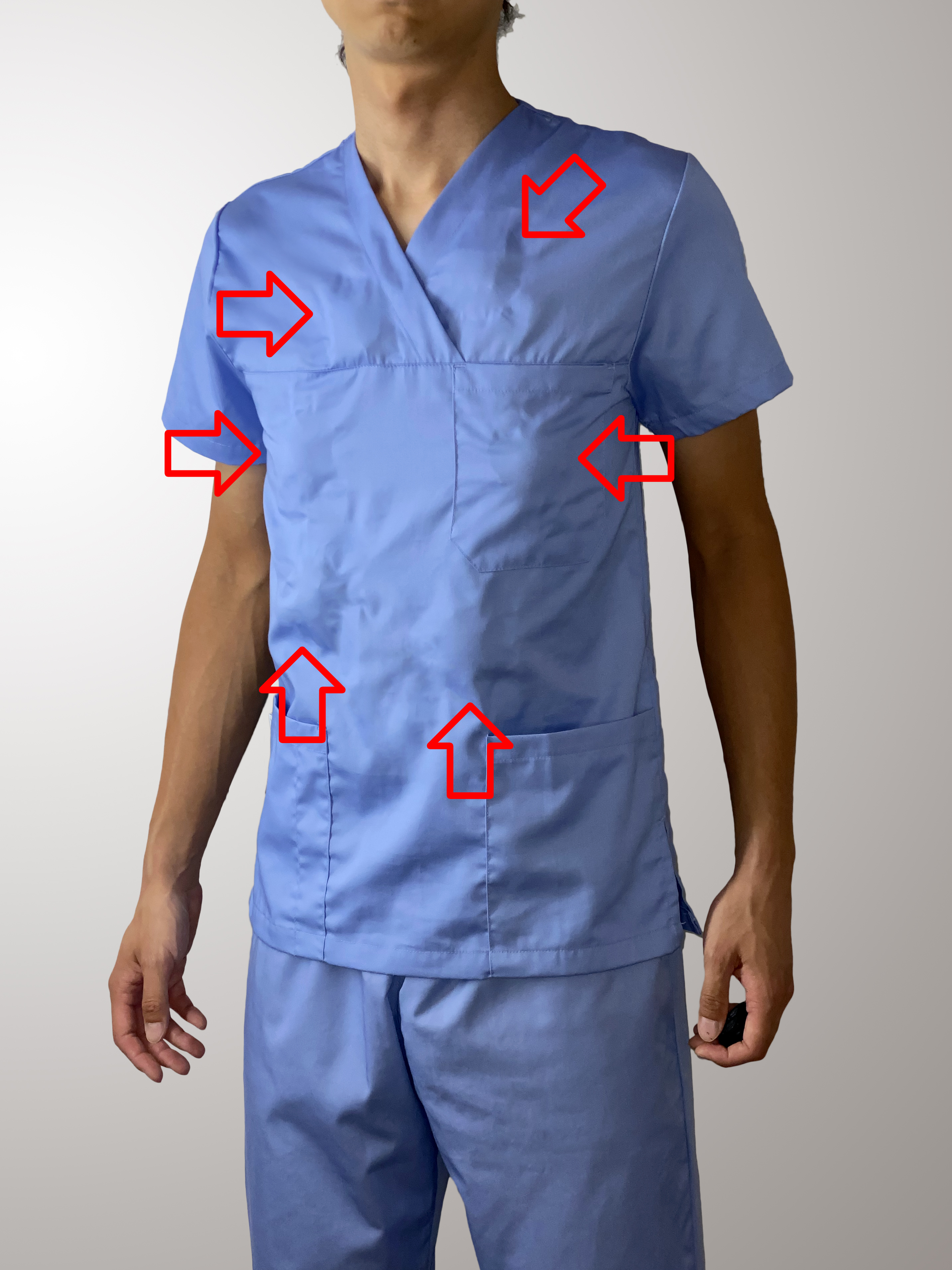
Loose, thin and light-coloured fabric. Each squib contains 15 g of fake blood.

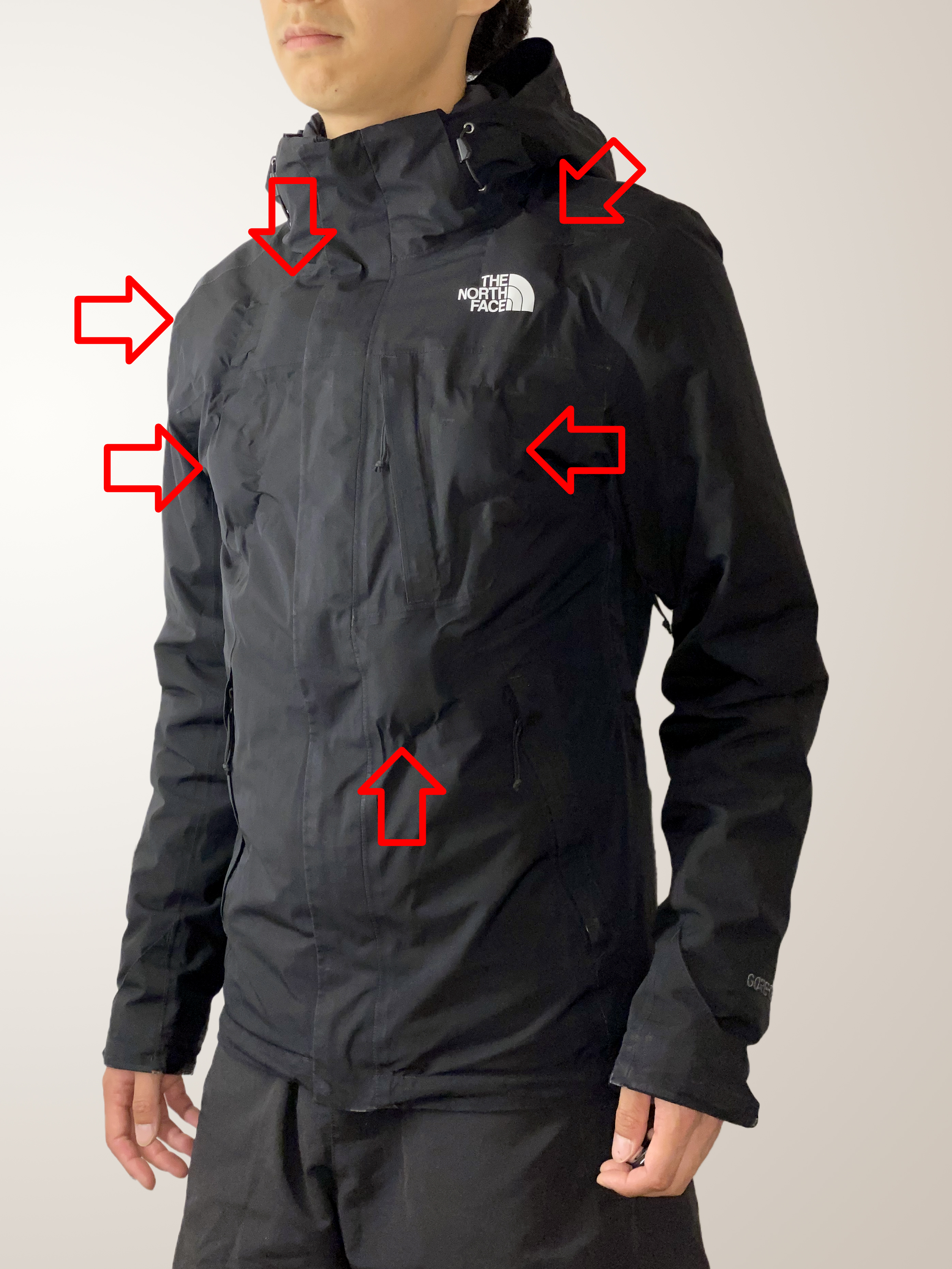
Padded jacket with dark-coloured fabric. 25 g of fake blood in each squib.

While most outfits can only be used once due to the destructive nature of squibs on the material, jackets (e.g. waterproof, parka and down) and other durable clothing may be reused if the bullet holes are crosshatched in well-defined, clean-looking cuts. These garments can be wiped clean and reset for additional takes, such as the jacket in the main figure featuring pre-cut holes used for demonstrations. Other advantages include their ability to conceal devices, provide additional padding, support multiple squibs and be easily worn and removed, thereby minimising the risk of accidental premature rupturing. The main disadvantage of reusing jackets is that the reset requires more time between takes. Stronger fabrics may require more significant weakening or the use of a more powerful squib to ensure the bullet hole can be blown open, otherwise the squib may not rip up the fabric at all or in such a way that does not resemble a bullet hole.

=== During filming ===
Depending on the availability of hero and stunt costumes, the scene's length and the actor's comfort, the prepared outfit may be worn just before the shot, throughout a scene, or even for the entire day. However, it is advisable to minimise the time spent in the stunt costume to avoid accidental damage to the squibs, such as sitting against a chair with back squibs or spilling liquids that could affect the costume or the equipment.

Once a take is successful, the wardrobe department photographs the "aftermath" to maintain continuity and prepares for the next take, scene, or clean up, or saves them for reshoots. In some cases, bullet holes may be enhanced for subsequent scenes. Costumes modified with squibs are not usually returned to the costume shop due to the irreversible damage caused by the pre-scoring on the fabric and the modifications inside.

=== Post-production ===
In post-production, techniques are often used to minimise the visibility of squibs and fabric scoring. Footage may be cut just before the squibs are triggered, or the use of digital editing tools such as reference frames and content-aware fill are also possible to some extent. Additionally, sound design further enhances the impact of gunshot effects.

== Production costs for bullet hit squibs ==
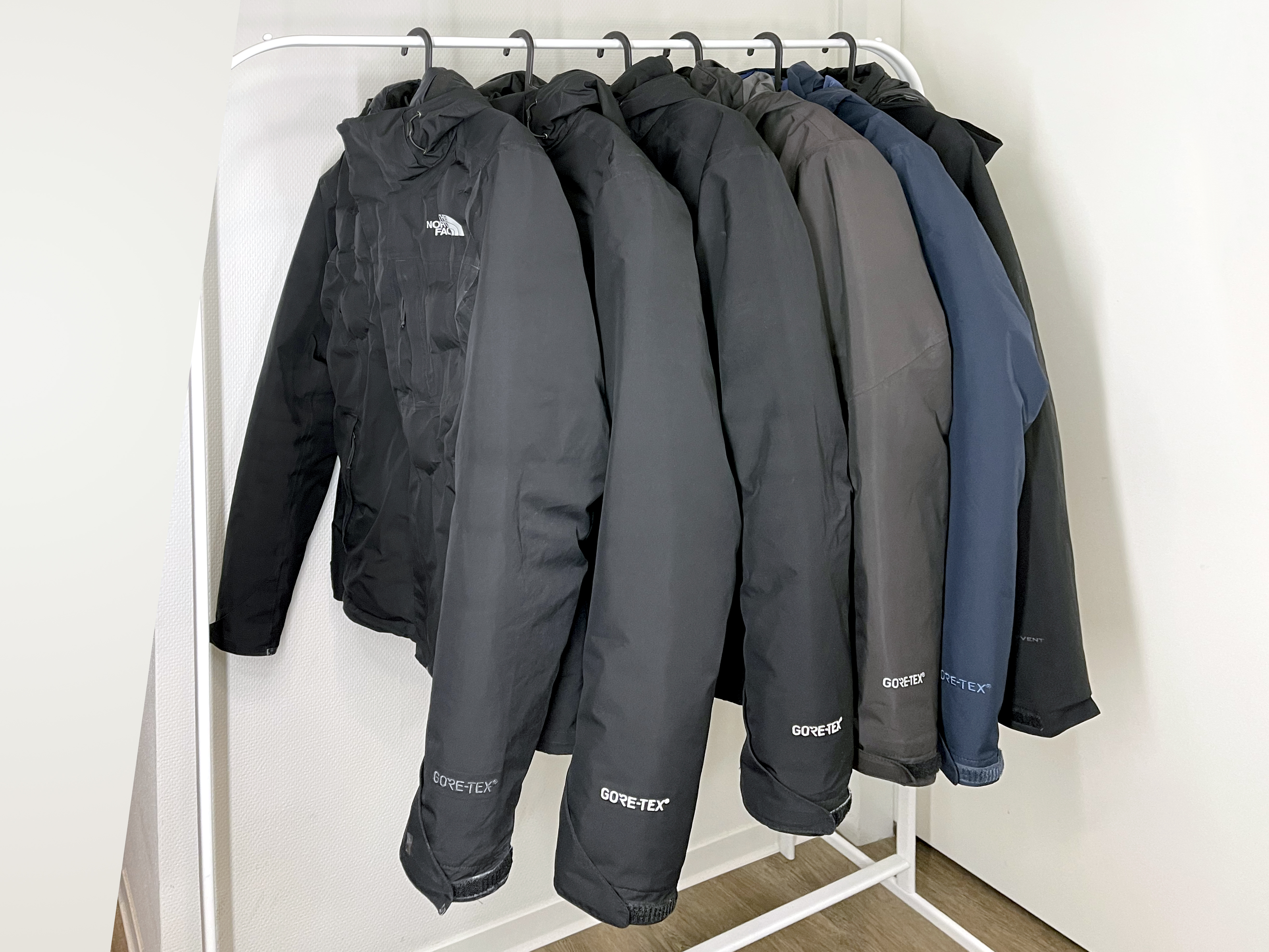
Six jackets used for a scene involving blood squibs. The first jacket shows six squibs installed, which is worn by the actor shown below.

The making of bullet hit squib effects involves several expenses, including raw materials, labour, permits, and costumes. The primary component, squibs, generally cost between $20 and $60 each. Fully assembled devices – including fake blood, plastic packets, duct tape, wiring, and protective shields – can cost around $150–300. Preparing squibs for a shoot can require approximately 10–20 minutes per unit, an entire day for assembly and another day for costume setup, typically overseen by specialised pyrotechnicians who manage setup, testing, and detonation during filming.

Costumes are another significant budget factor, especially with multiple outfits required to accommodate retakes. Using jackets shown on the right for a winter shootout scene as an example, with one reserved as the hero costume, one for testing, three for the stunt and another for dress rehearsal, totalling an estimated wardrobe budget of $3,000 at around $500 each without accounting for other wardrobe pieces. Fitting 30 squibs, or six each to the testing, stunt and dress rehearsal duplicates, would cost approximately $4,500-9,000, bringing the material costs alone for this stunt to approximately $7,500-12,000. In certain cases, selecting a more powerful squib (such as D80-1 instead of D80-¼ or D80-½) allows costumes to omit the pre-scoring step, enabling unused costumes to be retained or refunded after filming.

Labour costs, including hiring technicians and obtaining location-based permits, further contribute to the budget. Rehearsals are sometimes conducted to acquaint with the effect and to speed up the filming process. The underlying cost of one take with ten squibs can be approximately $7,000 to $40,000 on set, excluding director, cinematography and talent.

== Health and safety considerations ==
=== Safety protocols and permit requirements ===
The production company is responsible for ensuring safety when using firearms, explosives, and squibs on film sets. Special permits to notify local authorities are needed for squib use—specifying the number of takes, number of squibs per take, types of squibs and distance from talent. Only licensed technicians may handle explosives, and strict safety measures, including personal protective equipment, must be observed. Incidents, including misfires or injuries, are documented and response protocols in place.

=== Technician qualification ===
The handling of squibs is restricted to trained professionals, usually those with a T2 pyrotechnics licence. Squib device assembly, however, is often learnt on the job, leading to variations in production and safety methods among technicians. There have been reported cases of ad-hoc squib manufacturing, even in professional settings, causing injuries due to inconsistencies in construction or inadequate safety measures.

=== Personal protective equipment and risk management ===
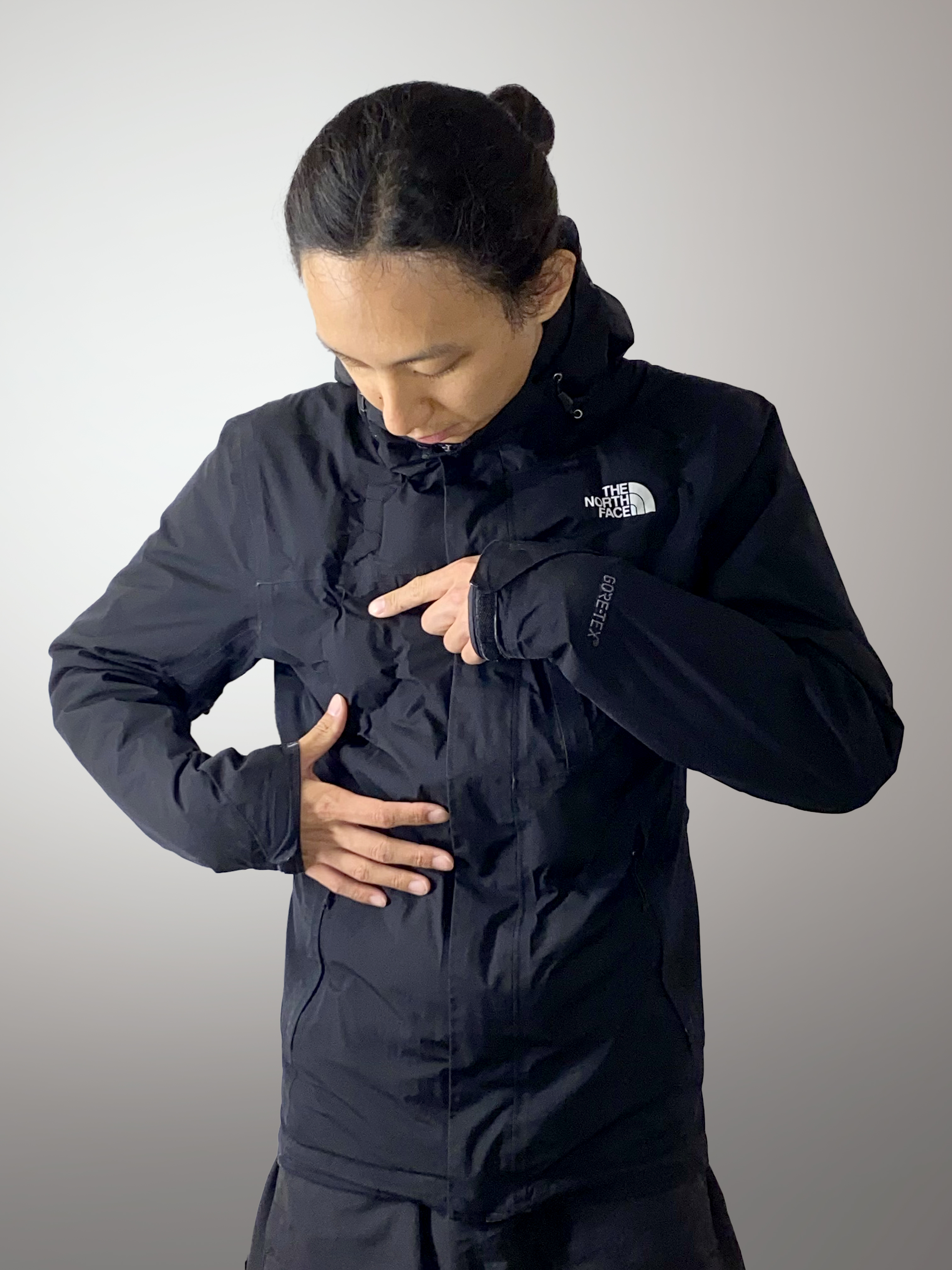
The actor shows and points at one of the blood squibs on his chest and checks that it is securely attached to the jacket.

Like conducting fireworks, shooting a scene with blood squibs starts with a thorough risk assessment to identify hazards, such as the squib placement on actors, environmental risks such as weather, location and crowd in a public space, and risk mitigation emergency protocols such as misfires, medical plan, PPEs and emergency stop mechanisms are in place.

To protect the actor from the blast of the squib, a lipped shield made of metal or dense plastic with soft padding is typically used as the base of the squib device. Prescoring the costume and consistent alignment of the squib and hole minimise the explosive force needed.

During blocking, the actor dons the squib-rigged jacket shown in the adjacent photo as an example. Here, the squibs are inspected to ensure they remain securely attached, and circuits are rechecked. Safety instructions and timing of squib explosions are informed to ensure the actor is comfortable with the stunt. The actor is also required to wear personal protective equipment such as ear protection (and if possible eye protection), avoid looking at the squibs and keep arms away during the stunt. Additionally, safety protocols dictate that other cast and crew members maintain a minimum distance of 0.5 to 2.5 meters from the squibs, depending on the size of the charge.

A two-step ignition process is often used, controlled by both the actor and the crew to prevent accidental triggering. It typically involves two separate actions to arm and fire the squib. For example, the first step might arm the device by connecting the power, while the second step would trigger the squib. This setup ensures the squibs are detonated only when both steps are intentionally completed.

The squibs are typically detonated on a specific cue, such as a line in the script, a countdown, or a particular location in the scene by the actor or an off-camera crew. The actor reacts to the detonations to complete the shot. After each take, technicians check for potential misfires. Fake blood spilling on the ground can become a slip hazard. Careful manufacturing and strategic planning with multiple camera angles can reduce the need for repeated takes, minimising the actor's exposure to the squibs. A dedicated safety officer is often present to oversee the stunt and communicate between personnel. Any issues that occurred are documented, shared feedback and improvements for future setups are identified.

=== Lead exposure ===
On film sets, the use of blank ammunition and squibs can release harmful chemicals, including lead styphnate and lead azide, posing significant health risks. Lead particles from squibs have been found to exceed EPA and occupational safety standards by more than 500 times in an enclosed space, potentially affecting actors, crew members, and stunt performers. While some productions have moved to safer alternatives like pneumatics or digital effects, commonly used squibs, such as the D-60 and D-80 series made by De La Mare, still contain lead, contributing to ongoing health concerns in the industry. Due to these associated risks and concerns, lead-free alternatives with, for example, silver azide, are emerging, which also enables a "better picture" due to less smoke produced, faster detonation flash and higher detonation pressure.

== Alternative practical bullet hit devices ==
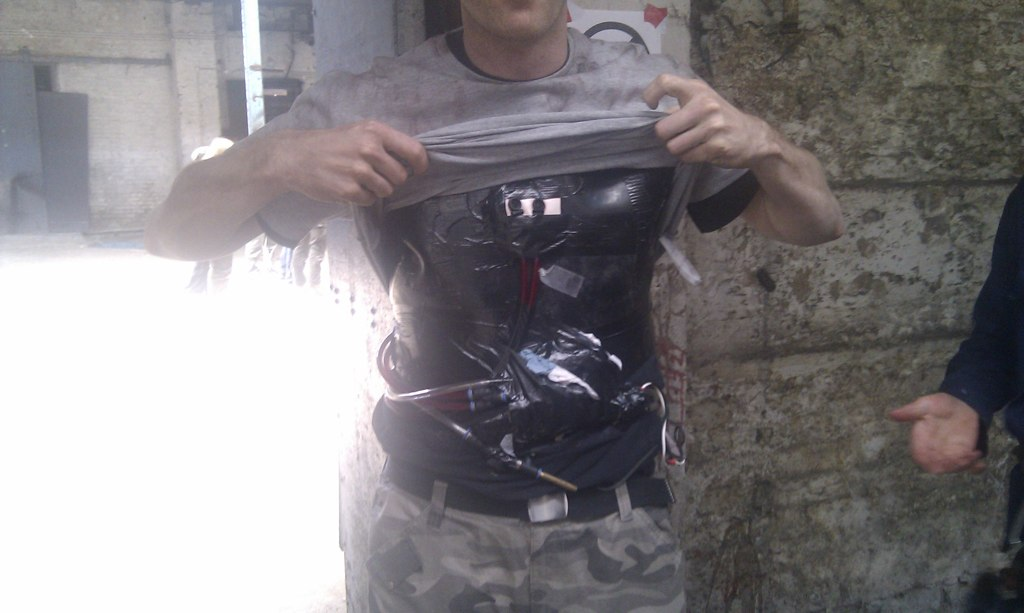
Compressed air bullet hits with multiple tubing and spray nozzles beneath the actor's t-shirt.

Filmmakers with limited budgets can create a similar effect without squibs by using a fishing line attached to a washer glued onto a blood pack, pulled through a precut hole. Alternatively, rocket igniters or electric matches can be employed. However, these methods lack the initial burst from squibs and typically produce only a stream of blood.

More advanced methods using pneumatics (compressed air) emerged in the 2010s, offering safer options without needing pyrotechnicians, thereby reducing costs. An example is shown in the accompanying picture. However, they are bulkier, heavier, harder to control, and less reliable and not preferred for multiple bullet hits. Despite not using explosives, they may still be erroneously referred to as "squibs". Initially developed from garden sprayers in the early 2000s, these devices have been refined, but the resulting effect is less convincing with a jet of blood spray instead of an aerosol burst, and rigid tubing is difficult to conceal. If the pneumatic system is worn by the actor, the outlets need to be precisely aligned with the garment, as they do not blow a hole through the costume. Alternatively, if it is built into the costume itself, multiple systems are required for each setup.

== Notable statistics ==
The record for the most squibs ever set off on a person is held by Mike Daugherty in 2005, on whom 157 out of 160 squibs successfully detonated.

Approximately 130,000 squibs are used each year in the filming industry.

The final shootout of The Wild Bunch used more than 3,000 squibs and took over eleven days to film.

== See also ==
- Bodily mutilation in film
- Dead-character costume
- Fake blood
- Firecracker
- Practical effect
- Pyrotechnics
- Special effect
- Squib (explosive)
