= Boston School of Oratory =

The Boston School of Oratory was a private institution in Boston, Massachusetts, founded in 1879 by Robert R. Raymond, a dramatic reader. It succeeded the Boston University School of Oratory, which had sometimes been informally known by the same name.

== History ==
In 1873, Boston University opened a School of Oratory headed by Lewis Baxter Monroe as dean. In its second year, Robert R. Raymond joined the faculty as Delineator of Shakespearian Character. By its last year, it had over 100 students, and its graduates included Georgia Cayvan and Leland T. Powers. In 1879, following the death of Monroe, the university decided to close the school. That same year, Raymond organized a new school in the same building as the old one and named it the Boston School of Oratory (BSO). A private venture, it continued the legacy of Monroe and attracted some of the same faculty. The school taught the Delsarte method of dramatic expression.

In 1884, Raymond relinquished leadership of the BSO due to failing health and turned it over to Moses True Brown, who had held the chair of oratory at Tufts College. By the mid 1890s, the school had grown to around 70 students pursuing studies that lasted between one and three years. Among the faculty were Florence Adelaide Fowle Adams, who headed the Department of Pantomime, and Hamlin Garland, who headed the Department of Literature.

In 1893, the school moved to new quarters in the Back Bay near Copley Square. The following year, it was bought by the Emerson College of Oratory.

== Notable alumni ==
- Sarah Lord Bailey (1856–1922), elocutionist and teacher
- Nan Macpherson Smith (d. 1940), leader in New Brunswick women's activities, as well as patriotic, philanthropic, cultural, missionary, and benevolent projects
