= New Brunswick Teachers' College =

- Type: Normal school
- Active: February 10, 1848–1973
- Location: Fredericton, NB, Canada
- Campus: Urban

The New Brunswick Teachers' College was a normal school in Fredericton, New Brunswick which granted teaching certificates.

It was founded on February 10, 1848, as the Provincial Normal School with Joseph Marshall de Brett Maréchal, Baron d'Avray as the first principal. The institution changed its name in 1947 to become the New Brunswick Teachers' College.

Located at 453 Queen Street at the intersection with York Street in downtown Fredericton, the building at this site was constructed after a 1929 fire destroyed the original facility which had stood since 1877. A French language department was established in 1884 under principal Alphée Belliveau. A French-language Normal School was opened in 1968 on the Université de Moncton campus in Moncton, New Brunswick.

The New Brunswick Teachers' College closed in 1973 and its staff were integrated into the faculties of education at the Université de Moncton and the University of New Brunswick.

The old New Brunswick Teachers' College building was used by Fredericton High School until its new facility on Prospect Street was completed. Today, the NBTC building has been remodelled to house the law courts and renamed the Justice Building.

== Notable alumni ==
- Nan Macpherson Smith (d. 1940) leader in New Brunswick women's activities, as well as patriotic, philanthropic, cultural, missionary, and benevolent projects in the Saint John area.
