= Costume coordination =

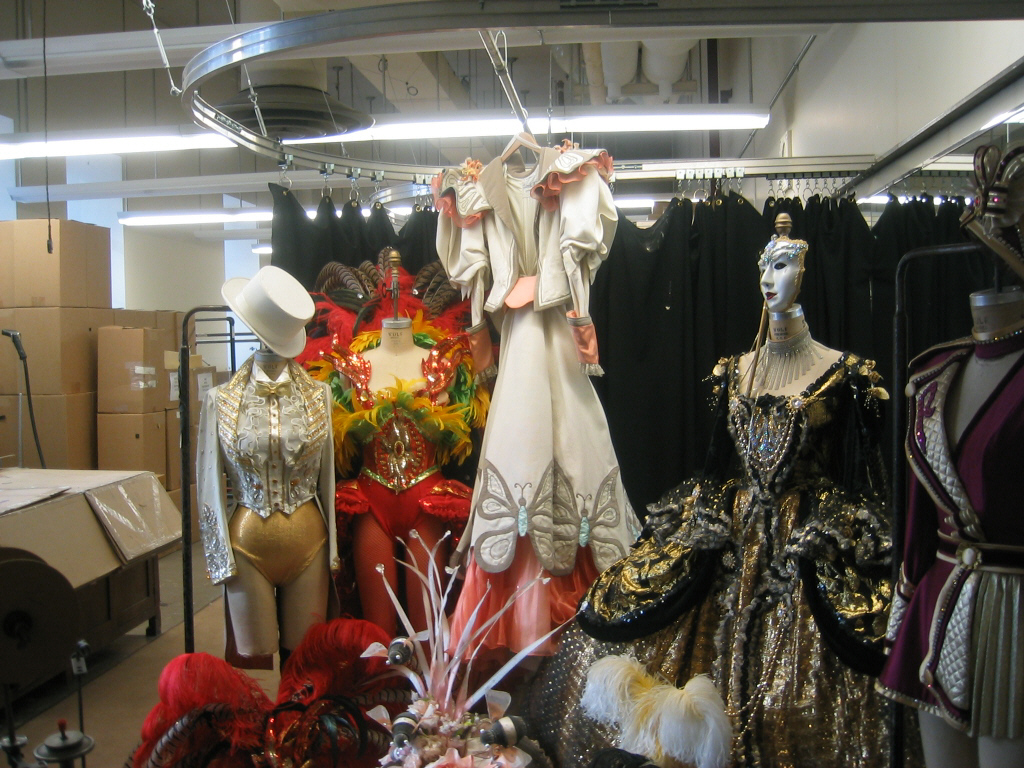
Costume storage at Radio City Music Hall, New York

Costume coordination is a method of dressing actors, employees or a person or group for theatrical productions and any venue requiring a fully realized character. It consists of pulling or renting existing stock clothing and costumes, altering them as needed to be used as stage clothes in a theatrical production, oversee their use, cleaning and eventual return to storage or rental company. Just as with costume design, the costume coordinator creates the overall appearance of the characters, but with the use of on hand items, including accessories. Sometimes coordinators may have a small budget to augment the existing stock or alter it for production needs.

Many theatres with smaller budgets regularly reuse existing stock, especially older companies with large costume warehouses. It is also a staple of community theatre productions because it entails less time and effort and is the usual manner for schools to costume student performers from stored costumes donated or previously purchased.

Coordination of costumes is also required at theme parks and festivals which require performers and dancers to have a consistent appearance, or maintained as originally designed.

== Celebrity costumes ==
There are both costumes made for film and theater, and costumes designed to show off popular looks to fans and friends on the red carpet or other lavish establishments or events. Discovered by Insider articles, celebrity women tend to dress or half dress for that manner, when they are not filming or doing production. These specific locations include, the Red Carpet, Engagement photos, Music Awards, VMA's, Venice Film Festival, and the Grammy's.

== Costume trends ==
The fashion and costumes that are used in movies and theater actually have an effect on fashion shows and fans. These examples are seen on social media and common blogs. Some films are enjoyable by genres but others are memorable because of costumes. There are many specific designs and costumes that are used in production that valued and inspiring to most people today. Designers such as Keira Knightley and Audrey Hepburn have made many designs for films that are or have been in high fashion in reality. A few movies to think about and idealize are, Cinderella where there were much patients and dedication with the amounts of fabric used and the number of designers that worked on the dress. A few others, Mad Max Fury World, the designer received an Oscar for creating the costume for the character who Imperator Furiosa; Atonement, where the green dress worn in the film was to illustrate jealousy and temptation. One other film would be Kill Bill, where the character The Bride played a strong roll and needed an even stronger costume to go with it. There are plenty of other movies and famous designers to read into along with different awards won for the costumes. Movie costumes can definitely become a trend in reality. For an example, the film where, Marilyn Monroe wore a white halterneck dress standing over a subway vent and how it became so popular because how beautiful it was or how correctly it was worn. It also left a message telling women "how to really wear it." Costumes in film or stage have the ability to have some sort of an effect on fashion in society. To go through the list of top designs more, The Matrix where they wore trench coats and shades to build a serious character. Factory Girl being another film which shows exaggeration in the costumes for that time frame. One famous and popular film mentioned would be Cleopatra, where the designer Renle made very creative and unique costumes. The designer didn't use accurate costumes to tell the story but what made the film interesting was the fun that the designers and directors put into it.

== Famous designers ==
There are many famous designers that are left behind the scene and aren't always recognized for their work but some have significantly made it into the spotlight. Many designers began sewing when they are young and they would start off with small creations. Edith Head for an example is now as "The Greastest Costume Designer". In much news there are plenty of designers that have books written about them and their own websites of their designs. Edith Head had designed not only for herself but many other top celebrities like Grace Kelly. Sandy Powell is another known designer who talks about the particular work of a designer and the pressure. There are a lot of designs for a designer to complete and there isn't always enough time and sketches that need to be made for actors and directors preferences. In Head's words actors and actresses uses their fashion/costumes as a "camouflage" to indicate that they are a different person every time they are seen. Another designer is Kate Carin who does much work in South Africa. She has her own website that features her designs in films like, Saints and Strangers, Cape Town, The 51st State, Strongbow, The book of Negroes and the list goes on. This website talks about Carin's designs along with her relationships with directors; this is numerously stated in other research, mentioning the connection between the two. It also talks about her versatile style with being about to design costumes for commercials and also for period movies that takes research.

== Reading costumes ==
There is a lot of production and preparation used in a film so it is important to know how to read these costumes. There are popular costumes used in the 1300 to 1500s and also modern day costumes. These costumes discuss what certain costumes have and what does it mean. It also point out specific ways to educate oneself on the way costumes are used. Director of a costume organization, Deborah Landis, who suggests helping students and teachers to appreciate costume designs more. The article digs in a little deeper, particularly focusing on media literacy and observation. It talks about the collaborations between costume designers, directors, and cinematographer. The article is similar to "Role of Importance" by differentiating between fashion and costume designers but this article has more depth. It begins with saying fashion designers have labels to sell their designs while costume designers have no label and they simply make characters. Again there is a lot of research costume designers done to make a perfect character; visiting places that are still standing, learning habits of the culture, collecting photos and so on. Costume designers use portraits to match their sketches. She continues after each section of telling what costume designer does along with providing assignments to teachers for students.

For many people, costumes have importance. Costumes are made to make and invent a character in a film or play. Popular movies like "Romeo and Juliet", "Hamlet", and so on; are very collaborative movies that people constantly describe each significant style and fabric that a character is wearing throughout the film. These films are known for their heavy leather, lacquer red silk and all other things that were embedded into a costume, and other things made to represent those ages. There's a lot that goes into a costume according to this book, you have to select the fabric, cut out the costume, make sure it fits, and aging the costume which is making it look older by spraying it down with different things or painting over it. After the end of designing the costumes, it is then presented to the director for approval. Along with most costumes there are props to finish off a personality like knives, pistols, crowns, etc. depending on a character's role. These decisions are made by both the director and costume designer to give characters purposes in stories.

There's a book that highly discuss renaissance costumes called, "Settings and Costumes of the Modern Stage". This book doesn't just give information and photos about Costumes but also the stage and the setup to help with bringing characters to life. This information will be helpful because it gives costume designers their credit for their designs. The article discusses stage and costume connection, to help readers understand how costumes match the story/plot. This book has more pictures than words but it helps to create the understanding of a scene, story, and character. The book shows many photos and descriptions of plays like: Hamlet, Marriage, Resurrection, and so on. Authors, Simonson and Komisarjevsky also briefly mention the way New York Stage has made its changes in certain settings to a more glamorous fairy-tales (Simonson, Lee 1966). As mentioned above, there should be more appreciation for the work put into costumes. Even the simplest costumes that are in different genres affects a costume and tell a story. In science fiction it makes sense for directors and designers to dress up characters to create a fantasy and make it less compromising to relate. The film Tron Legacy where the colors of their costumes play big roles in the film and within the characters. These colors are specifically used to distinguish between the protagonist and antagonist. In Scott Pilgrim vs. the World, costumes indicate the enemy characters in this film that are called the seven villains. The costumes used in Robin Hood, was to connect to a certain time period of heroes of men that was formed in the medieval times. Costumes in films are used to enhance a reality of the narration not to define it. Simple outfits that are worn in film also tells some type of story or secret. Designers doesn't always enhance their characters by new fabric, costumes are rented from existing materials to fit characters in movies or plays. The use of colors and patterns in costumes are bold representations. Before a movie or play is produced, designers read scripts to identify the era in which the piece is taken place, this helps to get started on their first sketch. They create costume charts that label what characters are wearing in specific scenes. Their final sketch is presented after the first has been approved. The final sketch shows more vivid and unique features with the use of colors. All of this information sounds very similar to a fashion designer. Some people are unable to identify the difference between costume and fashion designers. Costume designing is made for characters in stories while fashion is for a person's style. Costume designs have limited time and assignments on creativity. There are more expenses used in costume designing and there is the need for research and knowledge of culture or history.
