= Florence Fowle Adams =

American actress

Florence Adelaide Fowle Adams
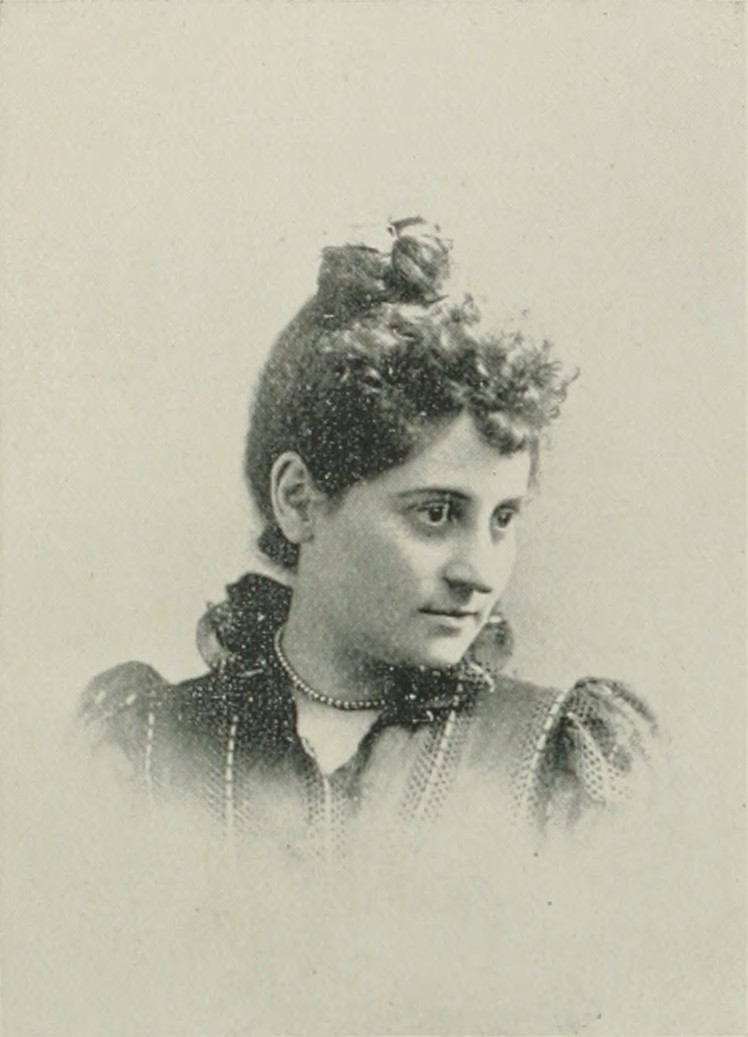
- Born: Florence Adelaide Fowle; October 15, 1863; Chelsea, Massachusetts, US
- Died: July 31, 1916 (aged 52); Pierce, Washington, US
- Education: Girls' Latin School; Boston School of Oratory
- Occupations: dramatic reader and teacher
- Spouse: George E. Adams (m. 1888)

Florence Adelaide Fowle Adams (October 15, 1863 – July 31, 1916) was an American dramatic reader, actor, author, and teacher.

== Biography ==
She was born Florence Adelaide Fowle in Chelsea, Massachusetts, the only child of the artist Edward Augustus Fowle. She attended the Chelsea public school, the Girls' Latin School in Boston, and the Boston School of Oratory, from which she graduated in 1884.

Fowle joined the faculty of the Boston School of Oratory, where she taught the Delsarte method of dramatic expression developed by the teacher François Delsarte. Feeling the lack of a textbook for beginning students that clearly set forth the principles of the Delsarte method, she published her own book on the Delsarte method, Gestures and Pantomimic Action (1891), using herself as the model for the volume's many illustrations.

She occasionally appeared on stage in dramatic roles; for example, as Julie de Mortemar in Edward Bulwer-Lytton's play Richelieu. She also organized her own company of young women for staging tableaux vivants, the Boston Ideal Tableaux Company.
