= Stage clothes =

Clothes used by performers on stage

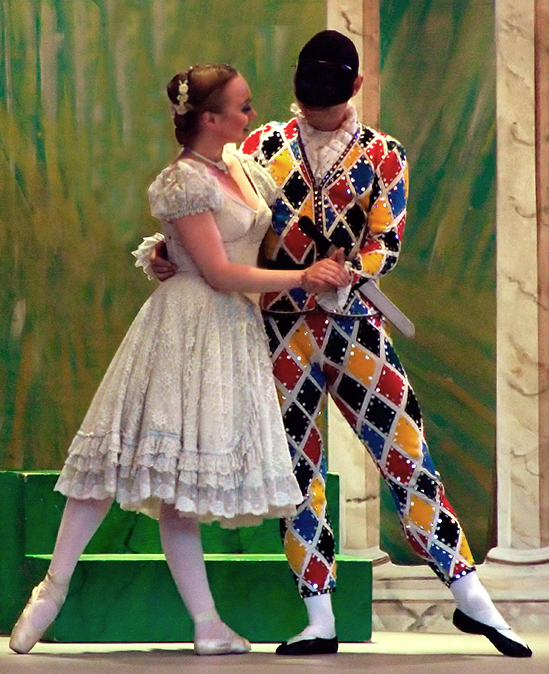
The costumes have a major role in commedia dell'arte, here for Columbine and Harlequin

Stage clothes is a term for any clothes used by performers on stage. The term is sometimes used only for those clothes which are specially made for the stage performance by a costume designer or picked out by a costume coordinator. Theatrical costumes can help actors portray characters' age, gender role, profession, social class, personality, and even information about the historical period/era, geographic location, time of day, as well as the season or weather of the theatrical performance. Stage clothes may be used to portray a historical look or they can be used to exaggerate some aspect of a character.

== Description ==
Any clothing used by performers (singers, actors, or dancers) on stage may be referred to as stage clothes. More specifically, the term is sometimes used only for those clothes which are specially made for the stage performance by a costume designer or picked out by a costume coordinator. However, many performers also pick up regular clothes and make them their "trademark look" on stage.

== Use ==
In combination with other aspects, theatrical costumes can help actors portray characters' age, gender role, profession, social class, personality, and even information about the historical period/era, geographic location and time of day, as well as the season or weather of the theatrical performance. Often, stylized theatrical costumes can exaggerate some aspect of a character; for example Harlequin and Pantaloon in the traditional commedia dell'arte. In certain cases, duplicates of the same stage clothes are prepared for a production, such as when performing in stunts involving bullet hit squibs.

Usually, in costume, historical accuracy is combined with a certain vision. The character that the costumer is dressing is also an important aspect, and a lot of the time the attitudes of the character is not exactly in line with the time period. For example, they may be more bright and colorful, or they may be more dull. A movie or stage production which emphasize the use of correct clothes and settings for a specific time period is called a costume drama.

Stage clothes often follow the evolving fashion but in a more extravagant way. Clothes worn by popular performers can often spark new fashions by themselves, as fans of performers want to look like their idols.

== Gallery ==
Example of stage clothes

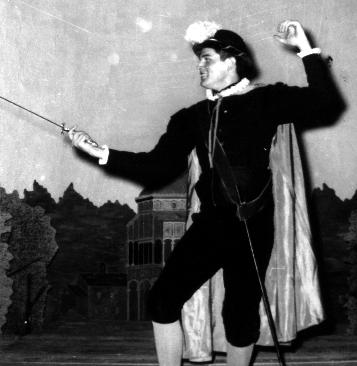
Shakespearean actor in fencing stance

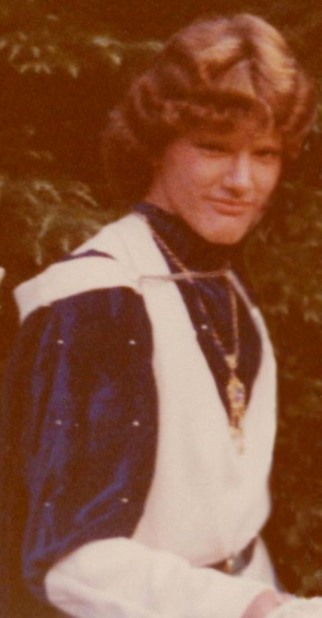
Actor in Elizabethan costume with tunic, medallion, and cape

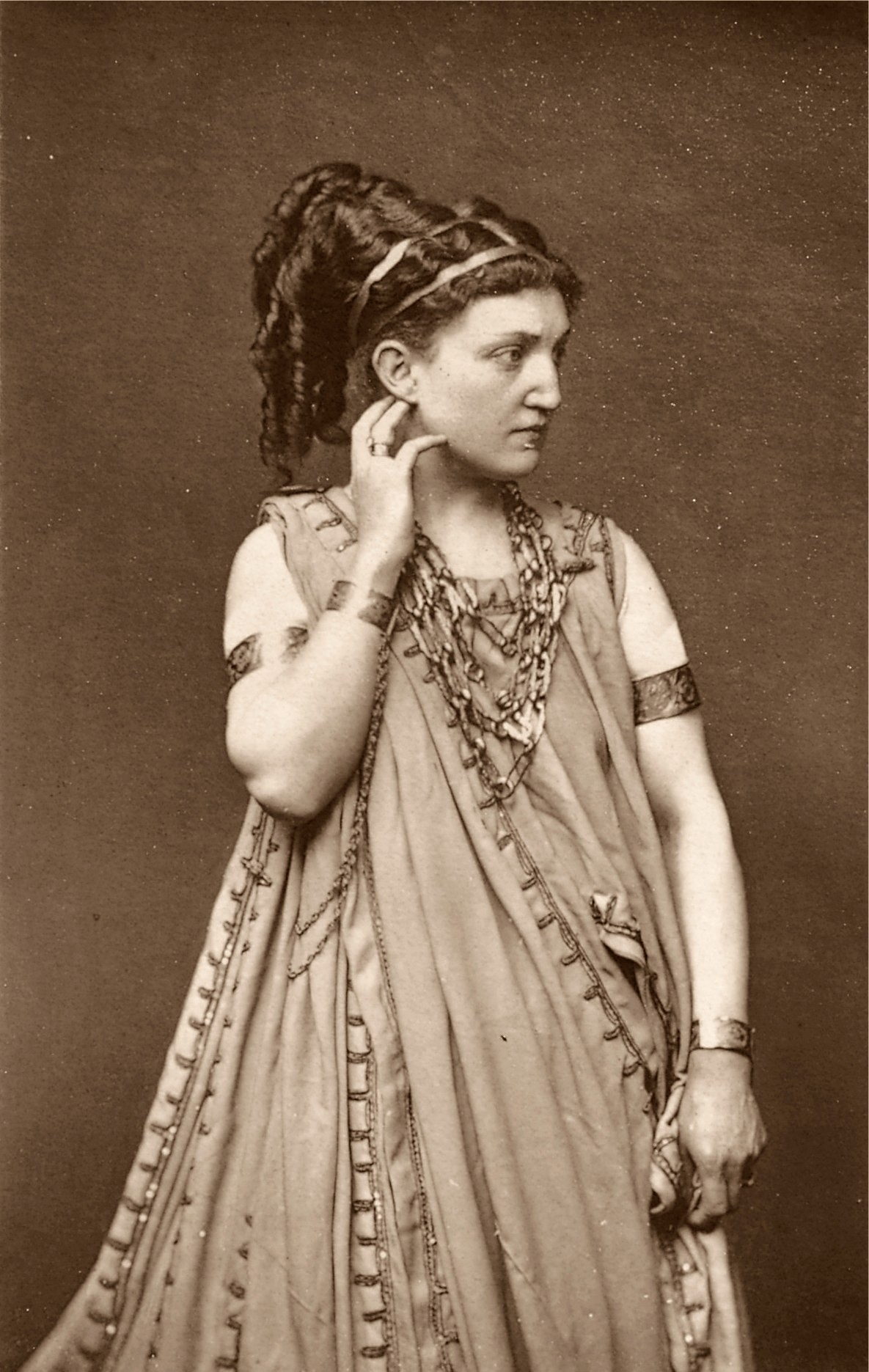
Kate Josephine Bateman in costume.

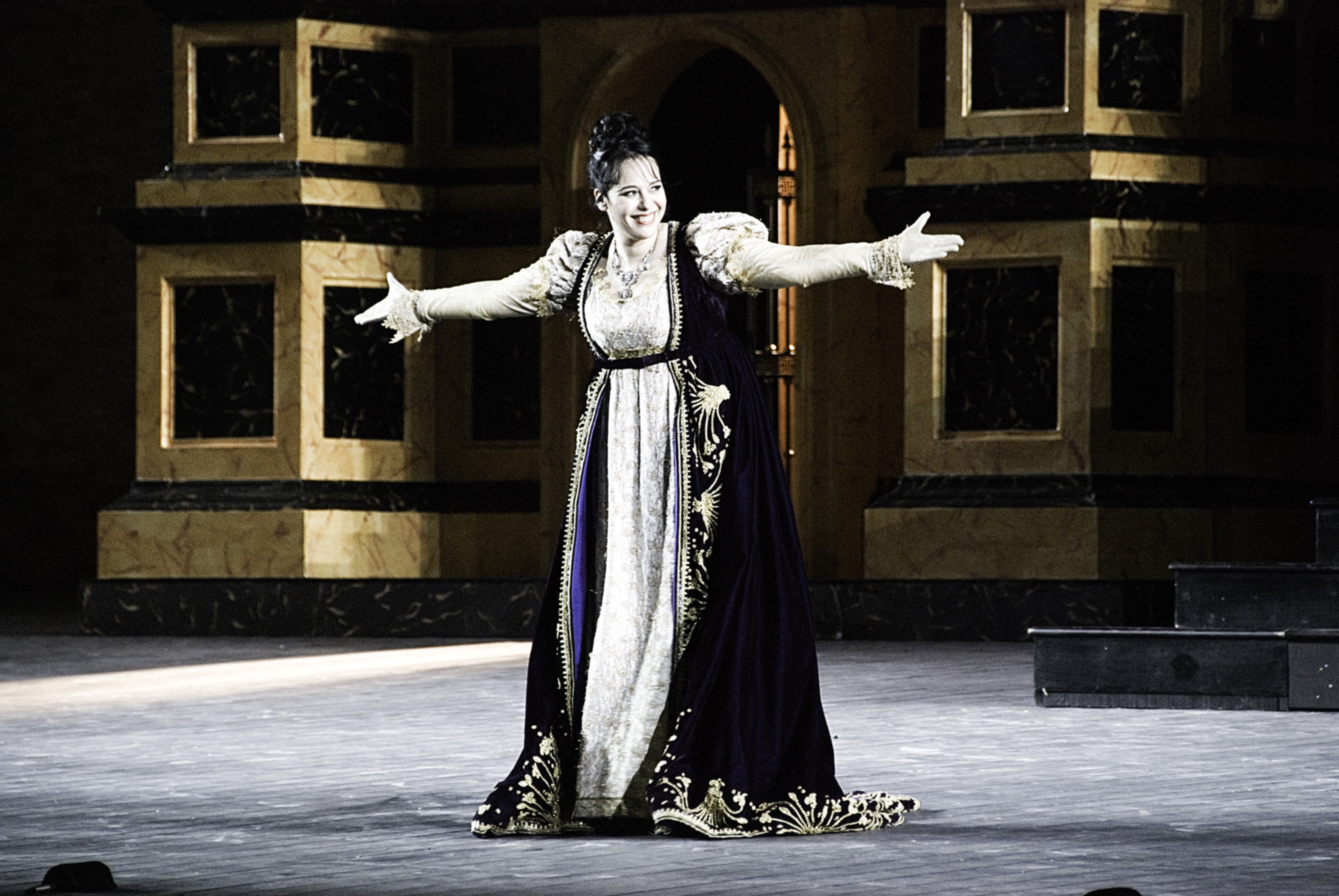
An opera singer in a production of Tosca

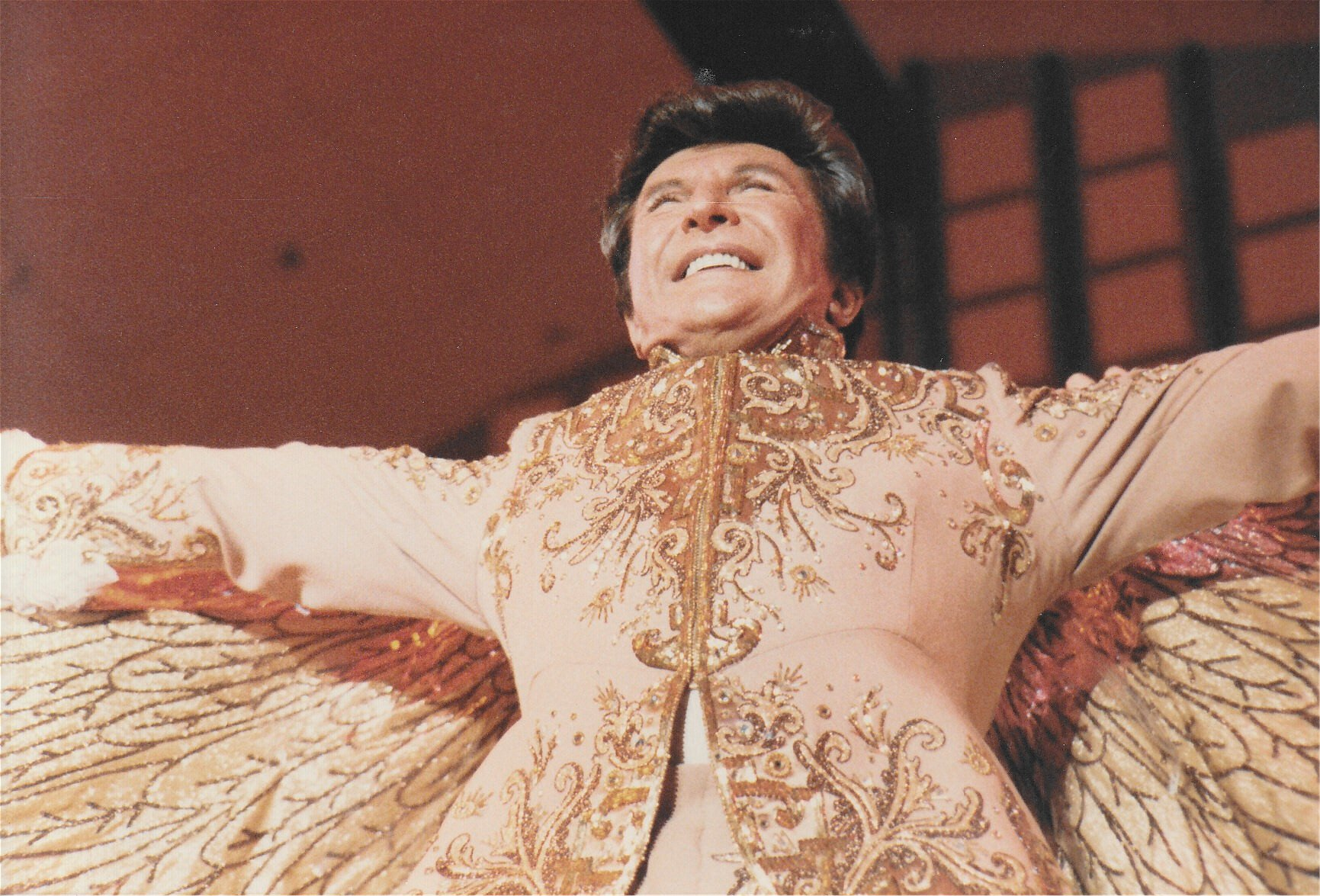
Liberace was well known for his extravagant stage clothes
