= Blood squirt =

Effect when an artery is cut

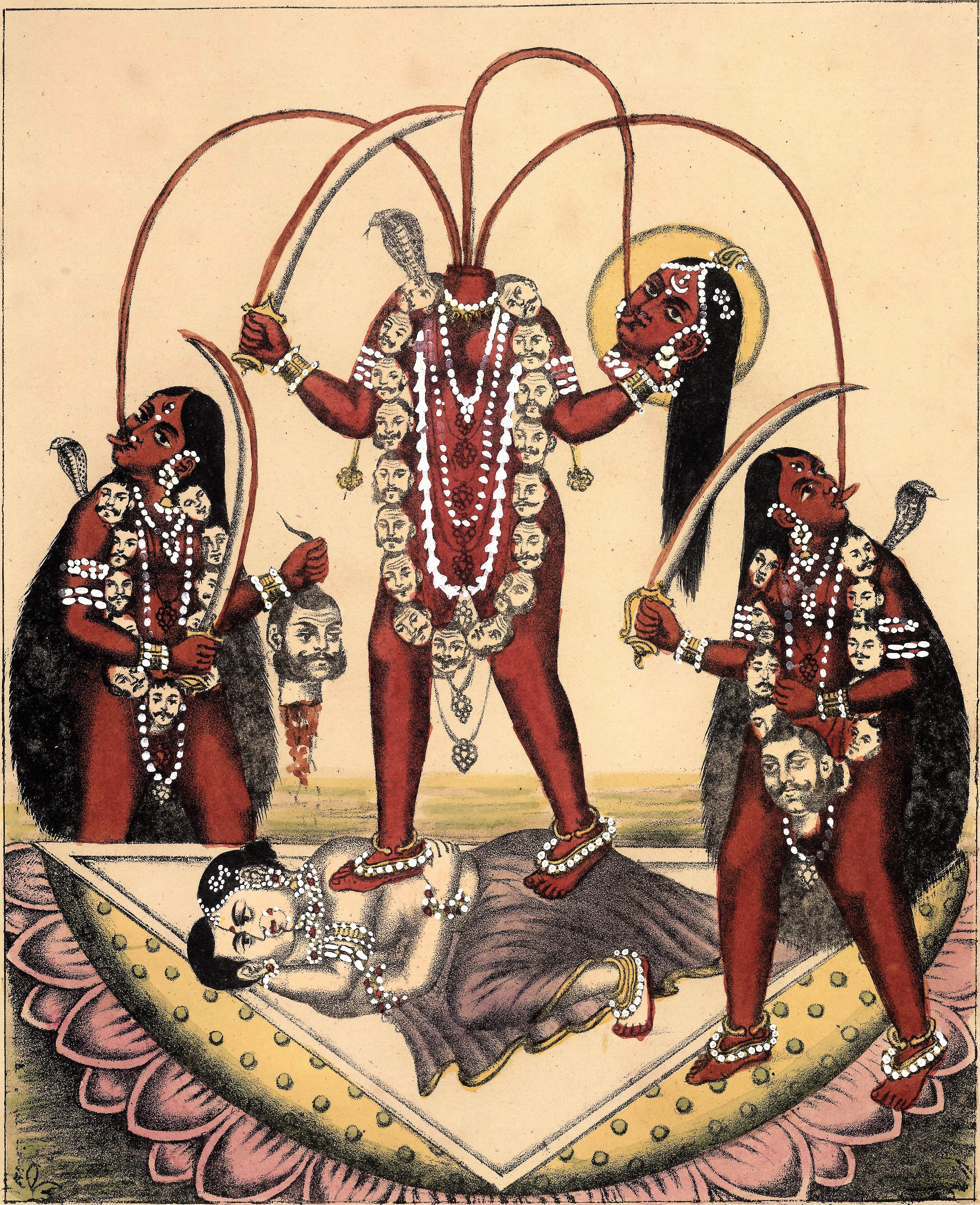
The goddess Chinnamastā squirting blood

Blood squirt (blood spurt, blood spray, blood gush, or blood jet) is a projectile expulsion of blood when an artery is ruptured. Blood pressure causes the blood to bleed out at a rapid, intermittent rate in a spray or jet, coinciding with the pulse, rather than the slower, but steady flow of venous bleeding. Also known as arterial bleeding, arterial spurting, or arterial gushing, the amount of blood loss can be copious, occur very rapidly, and can lead to death by exsanguination.

== Anatomy ==
In cut carotid arteries with 100 mL of blood through the heart at each beat (at 65 beats a minute), a completely severed artery will spurt blood for about 30 seconds and the blood will not spurt much higher than the human head. If the artery is just nicked, on the other hand, the blood will spurt longer, but will be coming out under pressure and spraying much further.

To prevent hand ischemia, there is a "squirt test" that involves squirting blood from the radial artery, which is used in intraoperative assessment of collateral arm blood flow before radial artery harvest. This is more commonly called "Allen's test" by microvascular surgeons, and is used before harvesting radial artery based free tissue transfers.

In 1933, a murder trial prompted a testimony from Dr. Clement Harrisse Arnold about how far blood could spurt from the neck: 6 in (15 cm) vertically and 18 in (46 cm) laterally.

== Iconography ==
Chinnamasta, a self-decapitated Hindu goddess, is depicted holding her head with three jets of blood spurting out of her bleeding neck, which are drunk by her severed head and two attendants. Saint Miliau, a Christian martyr killed c. 6th century AD, is sometimes represented holding his severed head, as in the retable of the Passion of the Christ at Lampaul-Guimiliau, where blood gushes from his neck.

== Insects and animals ==
Some animals deliberately autohaemorrhage or squirt blood (or an analogous bodily fluid) as a defense mechanism. Armored crickets, which are native to Namibia, South Africa, and Botswana, drive away predators by spewing vomit and spurting hemolymph (the mollusk and arthropod equivalent of blood) from under their legs and through slits in their exoskeleton. Katydids do it too, and in Germany the species has acquired the nickname "Blutspritzer", or "blood squirter". The regal horned lizard also uses the blood-spewing tactic, shooting the substance from a pocket near its eyes.

One of the oriental rat flea mouth's two functions is to squirt partly digested blood into a bite.

== See also ==
- Bullet hit squib, the special effect simulating blood spilling out of a gunshot wound
- Bloodstain pattern analysis, in forensic science
- Bodily mutilation in film#Blood
- Spurt of Blood, a 1925 French surreal play
- Theatrical blood
