= Practical effect =

Real-world (non-visual) special effect for cinema

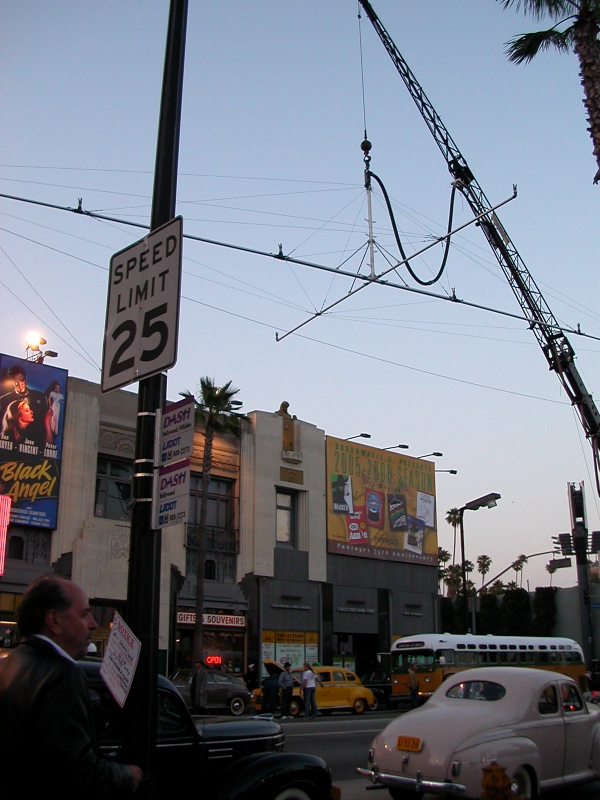
A location shot for The Black Dahlia with a rainmaking rig, a sprinkler system used to create the appearance of rain—a common practical effect

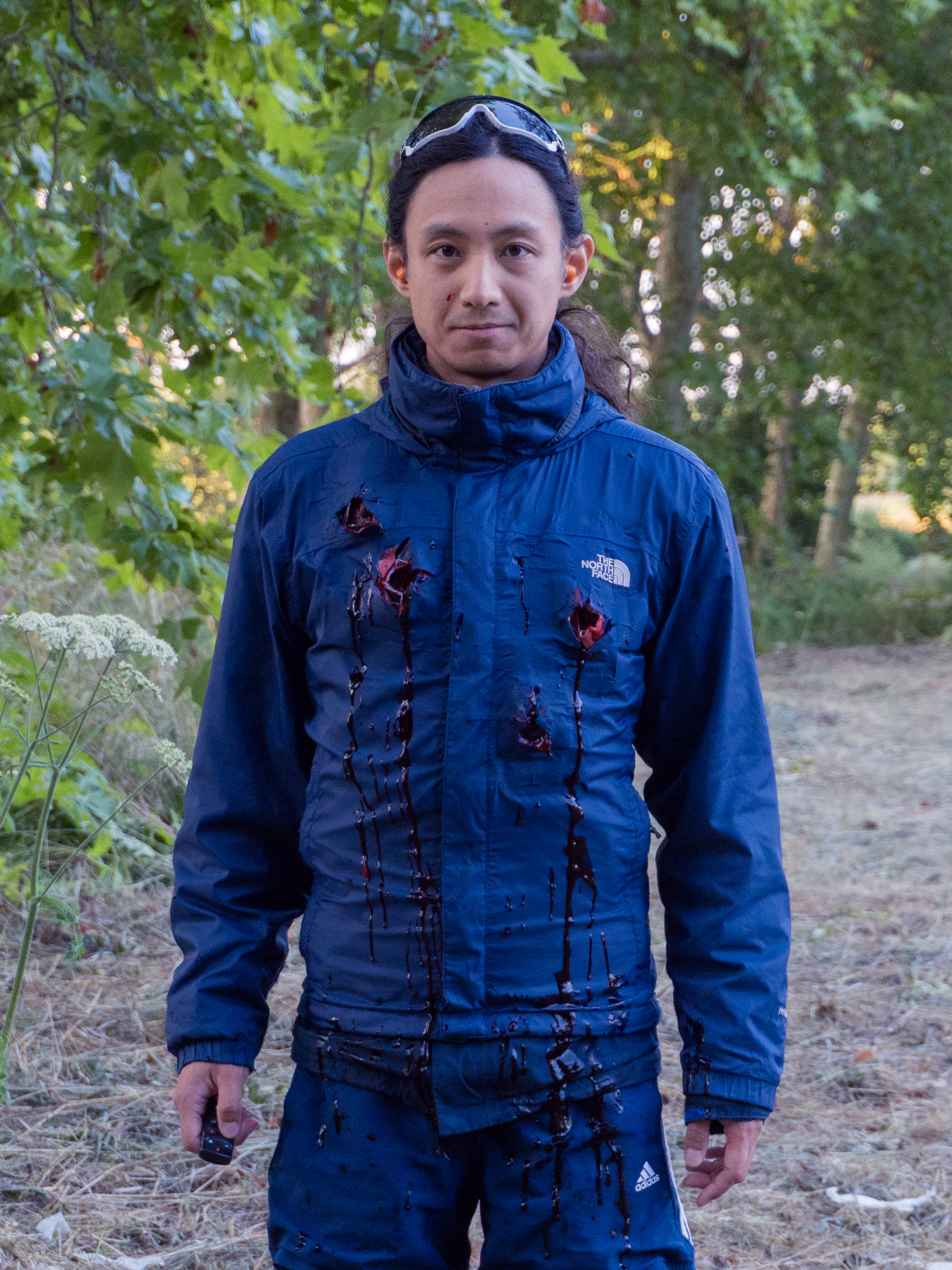
Aftermath of a gunshot wound stunt where bullet hit squibs hidden in the actor's costume blew open pre-scored "bullet holes", bursting fake blood through and subsequently running down the jacket.

In filmmaking, a practical effect is a special effect produced physically, without computer-generated imagery or other post-production techniques. In some contexts, "special effect" is used as a synonym of "practical effect", in contrast to "visual effects" which are created in post-production through photographic manipulation or computer generation.

Practical effects often use principles from magic tricks, exploiting the camera's single viewpoint to create convincing illusions that may work only from certain angles, or using specially created props designed to achieve the desired effect. These effects require an interdisciplinary skill set, combining artistic craftsmanship with technical expertise in mechanics and engineering to achieve the desired result.

Many of the staples of action movies are practical effects. Gunfire, bullet wounds, rain, wind, fire, and explosions can all be produced on a movie set by someone skilled in practical effects. Non-human characters and creatures produced with make-up, prosthetics, masks, and puppets—in contrast to computer-generated images—are also examples of practical effects.

== Practical effect techniques ==
- The use of prosthetic makeup, animatronics, puppetry, or creature suits to create the appearance of living creatures.
- Miniature effects, which is the use of scale models which are photographed in a way that they appear full sized.
- Mechanical effects, such as aerial rigging to simulate flight, stage mounted gimbals to make the ground move, or other mechanical devices to physically manipulate the environment.
- Pyrotechnics for the appearance of fire and explosions.
- Weather effects such as sprinkler systems to create rain, fog machines to create smoke, and fake snow.
- Body mutilation effects such as bullet hit squibs and fake blood to create the illusion of gunshot wounds.

== See also ==
- Special effects
- Computer-generated imagery
- Visual effects
- Optics: Visual effects
- Christopher Nolan
