= Bodily mutilation in film =

Methods of simulated injury

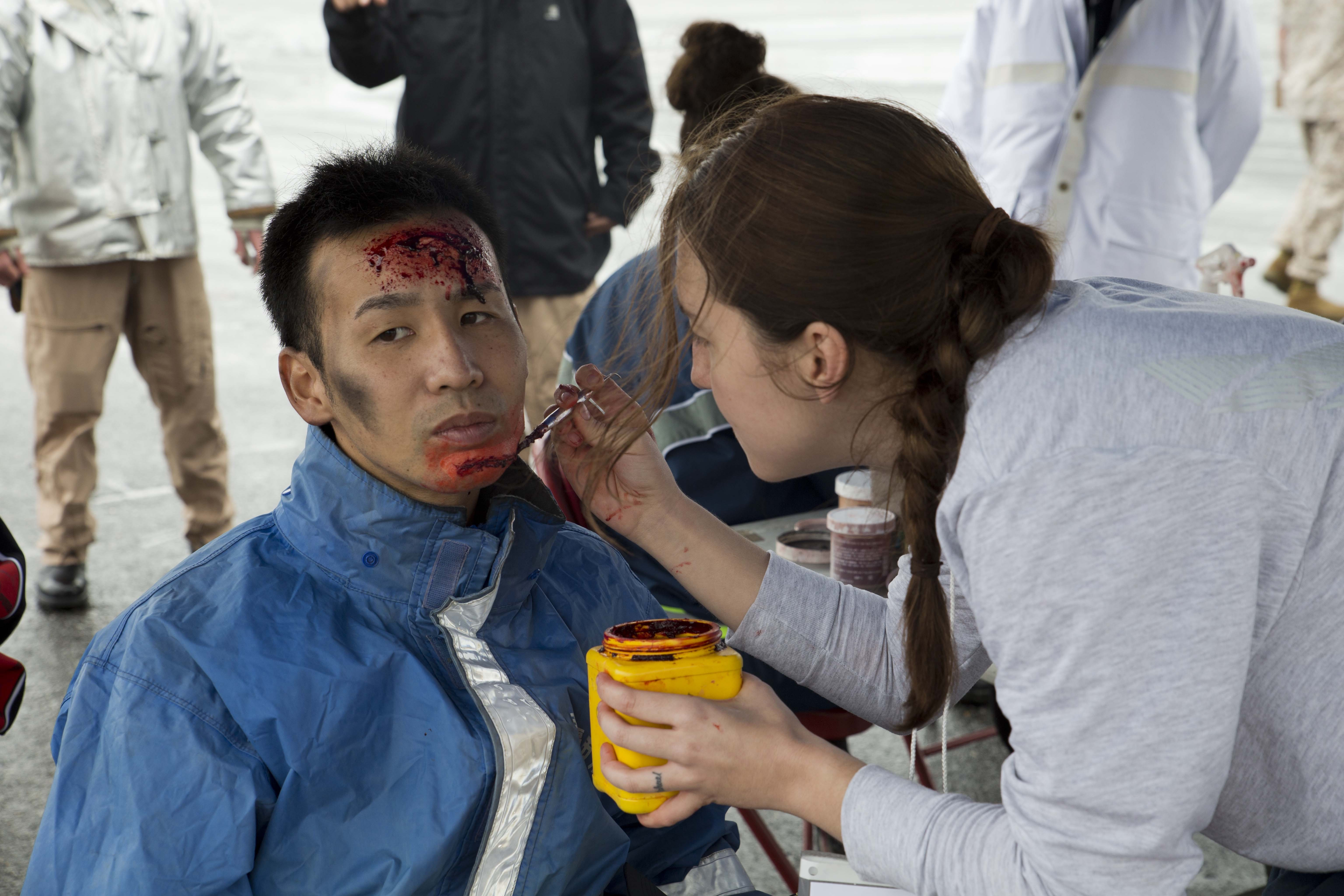
Artificial blood and makeup being applied

Bodily mutilation in film is the use of practical effects implemented on a film set during production, in contrast to visual effects, which are applied in post-production. The primary objective is to visually depict physical trauma endured by a character, aiming to elicit emotional responses from the audience and foster empathy towards the character. Bodily mutilation is most usually portrayed in the context of horror, but is also used in other genres, such as medical dramas or war films. It is used primarily either to shock or fascinate the audience of a film, or to add a sense of realism. Improved special effects in recent decades have seen an increase in the prevalence of bodily mutilation in film.

== Brief history ==
=== Early years ===
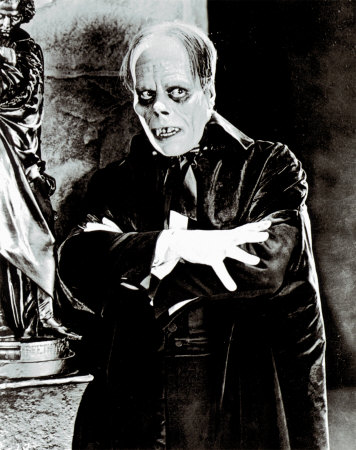
Lon Chaney as the phantom in the 1925 film The Phantom of the Opera

In the early years of motion picture, horror was often used in order to attract and intrigue audiences. The goal was to frighten and fascinate the audience. Lon Chaney was well known for his portrayals in various horror films, but the subject in focus is his use of makeup to create his ghastly visages. He was known as “the man of 1,000 faces.” (Rickett 2000) Chaney was arguably one of the forerunners of makeup use in horror films. Some others include actors Boris Karloff and Lon Chaney Jr. But it was the man behind their makeup, Jack Pierce, who made them what they were (Rickett 2000). While these movie makers didn't make films rife with violence and mutilation, their influence on later film makers was great. Early horror movies focused on suspense and monsters but as realism has progressed, movie makers have focused more on realistically portraying the horrible fate of whoever is unfortunate enough to fall victim to the fell devices.

=== Advent of horror ===
Although there was a boom of monster and alien flicks in the 50s and movie makers using make up more for realistic depictions of violence and gore in the 60s, the advent of realism in horror as we now know it arguably began with the 1973 film The Exorcist. This was the first of its kind as far as special effects used realistically to portray gruesome scenes. This movie, created by director William Friedkin with make up master Dick Smith directing the effects set the stage for countless other such films to be made. After the release of The Exorcist and its subsequent popularity scary movies began to shift and the violent horror flick became a major genre. With effects greats Kevin Yagher, Dick Smith, and Tom Savini behind such classic horror films as Friday the 13th (1980), A Nightmare on Elm Street (1984), Halloween (1978), and Dawn of the Dead (1978) this genre gained immense popularity (Rickett 2000). This craze peaked during the 80s went down a little in the 90s but with the movie Scream (1996) horror movies were back in. As special effects continue to get better, so the horror films continue to grow even more violent, gruesome, and realistic in their portrayals of human mutilation as can be seen in the recent Saw films (2004, 2005, 2006, 2007) as well as others such as Hostel (2005) and Hostel: Part II (2007). However horror films are not the only movies that have worked to realistically portray bodily mutilation.

=== War films ===
War movies have often romanticized battle and violence for glory; but after the Vietnam War, many movies worked to portray war in its true form, all the violence, brutality, and even the psychological distress included. This is shown in several films including The Deer Hunter (1978) and Casualties of War (1989). A great example is the classic film Saving Private Ryan (1998). In the beginning of this movie there is a 15-minute scene showing the landing of American troops at Omaha beach. In this scene there are untold amounts of blood and gore as German machine guns literally rip the U.S. soldiers apart achieved through bullet hit squibs. Other war movies such as Flags of Our Fathers (2006), Enemy at the Gates (2001), and Letters from Iwo Jima (2006) work to show the effects of battle on the human body.

== Notable names ==
=== Lon Chaney ===
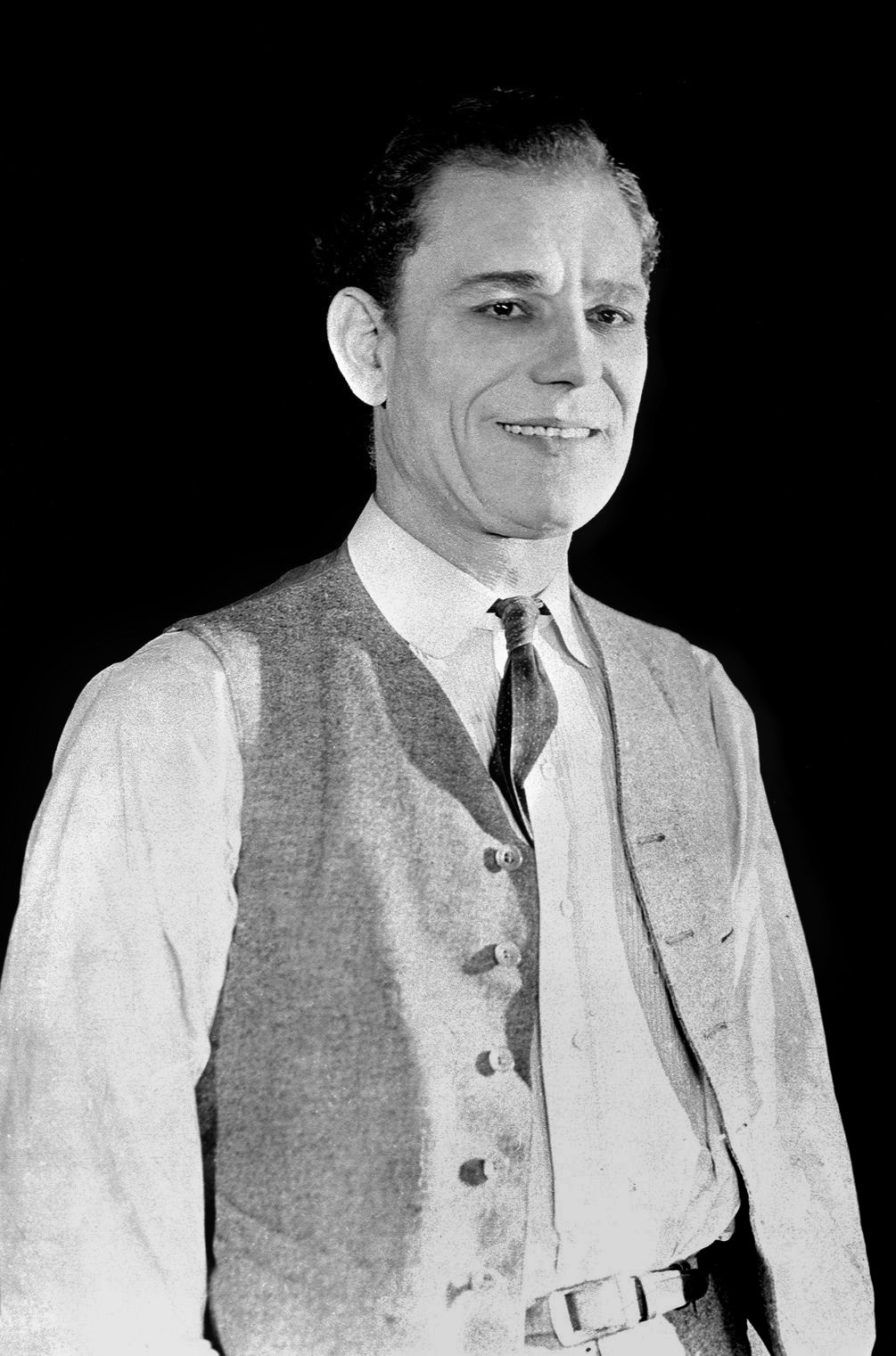
Lon Chaney, still from The Miracle Man (1919)

Although not a pioneer when it comes to mutilation, Lon Chaney was the inspiration for many film makers who were. Born on April 1, 1883, in Colorado Springs, Colorado to deaf-mute parents, Lon Chaney did not have the easiest childhood (Anderson 1997). However, this did not prevent him from becoming a magician with makeup. Throughout many various films, Chaney perfected his craft. He did his makeup for all the films he was in. Chaney's makeup kit set the standard for later makeup departments in Hollywood. While his most widely known films are The Hunchback of Notre Dame (1923) and The Phantom of the Opera (1925), perhaps some of his most important contributions to modern horror films and their emphasis on the mutilation came from his work in lesser known films. For example, Chaney used collodion to make realistic scars and deformities for his characters Singapore Joe in The Road to Mandalay (1926), Ricardo in Victory (1919), and Tiger Haynes in Where East is East (1929). Chaney died on August 26, 1930, in Los Angeles, California due to complications with throat cancer (Anderson 1997).

=== Jack Pierce ===
Jack Pierce was the makeup man behind popular monster creatures Frankenstein (1931), The Mummy (1932), and The Wolf Man (1941) (Rickett 2000).

=== Dick Smith ===
Born on June 26, 1922, Dick Smith is regarded for his contributions to the field of special effects makeup, particularly in the areas of prosthetics and age makeup. Notable examples of his work include Marlon Brando as the Don in The Godfather (1972), F. Murray Abraham as Salieri in Amadeus (1984), and Max von Sydow as Father Merrin in The Exorcist (1973). His most famous contribution to modern mutilation techniques is the 360° turn and transformation of Linda Blair's head in The Exorcist.

=== Tom Savini ===
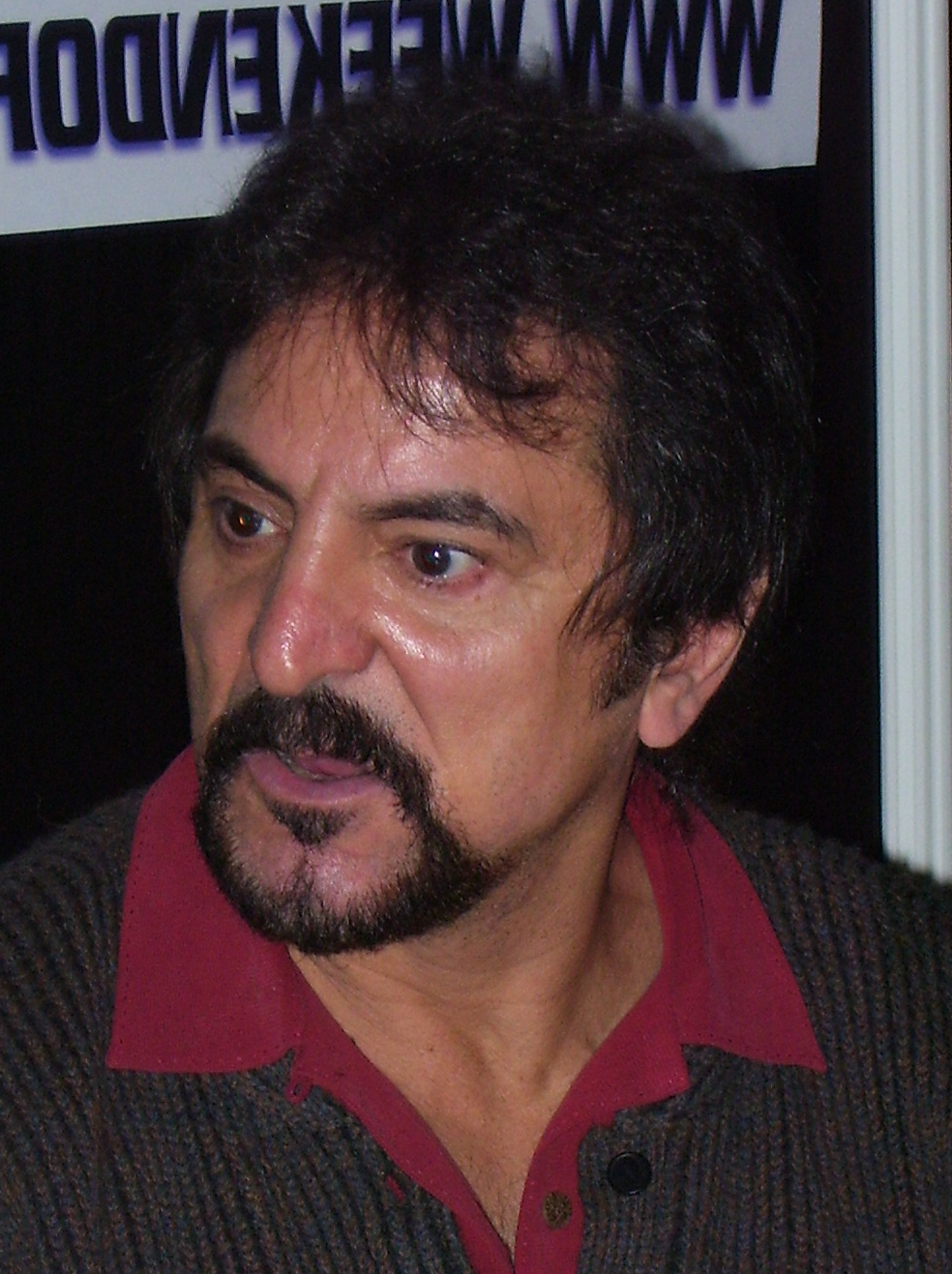
Tom Savini

Known as the King of Splatter (Rickett 2000), Tom Savini has quite a reputation for his work in horror movies much of which has included severe bodily mutilation in many circumstances. According to Anthony Timpone in his book Men, Makeup, and Monsters, Savini started his career young. Earlier makeup artists provided him with inspiration. “Lon Chaney became a hero,” he said. Drafted into the military during the Vietnam War, he became a combat photographer. He would practice his craft on the men he was with, but also got a taste of true gore. “I’ve seen the real stuff.” While in Vietnam, Savini saw many gruesome sights including bodies in rigor mortis and even a severed arm. This may have provided him with material he would later use in his movies. And he did use gore and violence in his movies. Perhaps this is stated best by Timpone.

“Prior to Savini’s work on Dawn of the Dead, realistic screen slaughter had rarely gone to the unrated extremes it would soon reach in the early 80s with Savini’s guidance. Via his macabre tricks, heads were severed, scalped, axed, exploded, and pierced. Machetes hacked off limbs, fangs tore through chunks of human flesh, and blood bags sprayed gallons of grue. Zombies, ghouls, demons, hideously disfigured maniacs, and other assorted Savini-created monsters racked up endless body counts.”

Savini was behind the effects of many notable horror films, including Martin (1978), Maniac, Friday the 13th (1980), Friday the 13th: The Final Chapter (1984), Day of the Dead (1985), The Texas Chainsaw Massacre 2 (1986), and Two Evil Eyes (1990). “My job is to create the stuff as realistically as possible.”

=== Rick Baker ===
Rick Baker is known mainly for his work making ape films (Timpone 1996). However, he is well known for his work on An American Werewolf in London (1981), specifically the on screen transformation of the main character into a werewolf (Multimedia Publications 2986). While this may not be considered mutilation, the transformation is a radical change from human to monster and therefore evokes many of the same emotions.

=== Kevin Yagher ===
Mastermind behind the psychotic doll Chucky, Kevin Yagher is known for his work with animatronics (Timpone 1996). He also did effects for the Nightmare on Elm Street movies 2–4.

=== Bob Keen ===
Bob Keen did effects on the movies Hellraiser (1987) and Nightbreed (1990).

== Movies and television shows ==
- An Andalusian Dog (1929) French short film with what looks like the slicing of a human eye in the opening sequence
- The Exorcist (1973) With the Linda Blair head turn and accompanying effects, this film inspired many film makers.
- Monty Python and the Holy Grail (1975): the slaughter of the Black Knight
- Martin (1978) The scene where Martin, the title character, slits the wrist of an unconscious girl shows a trick used to fool the audience into believing in the realism of the action.
- Dawn of the Dead (1978) This film was very original. In fact, according to effects man Tom Savini, this film was largely improvised during its making. “We’d be sitting around thinking of ways to kill a zombie.” These ways include stabbing one in the ear with a screwdriver, and cutting one's head to pieces with a helicopter's rotors.
- Halloween (1978) and sequels
- Friday the 13th (1980) and sequels
- The Howling (1981) With its full on screen transformation and a scene where Eddie Quist gets acid flung into his face before a transformation, this movie shows the human body realistically distorted, and mutilated in the case of the acid, in a way new to film at the time.
- An American Werewolf in London (1981) Released in the same year as The Howling, this movie also showed the change from man to wolf. It also shows some pretty gruesome undead. While released later than The Howling this movie used some innovative techniques developed by Rick Baker and who went on to win an Oscar for his makeup on the film. (Hollywood tricks of the trade page 133)
- The Evil Dead (1981) The makers of this movie found creative ways to solve production problems, including having to come up with their own formula for fake blood. This consisted of corn syrup, food coloring, and instant coffee to thicken it (Multimedia Publications 1986).
- A Nightmare on Elm Street (1984) and sequels
- Misery (1990) based on Stephen Kings novel - Academy Award for Best Actress for Kathy Bates
- Boxing Helena (1993)
- Scream (1996) and sequels
- ER (1994–2009)
- Saving Private Ryan (1998)
- CSI: Crime Scene Investigation (2000- ) and spin offs (Miami, New York, etc.)
- Black Hawk Down (2001)
- Saw (2004) and sequels
- Hostel (2005) and sequels
- Hatchet (2006) and sequels
- Dexter TV series, First season (started 2006)
- American Mary (2012)

== Techniques ==
The tricks of the trade are what make these effects convincing. The following are a few basic techniques or tricks that have been used to create the image of mutilation.

=== Blood ===
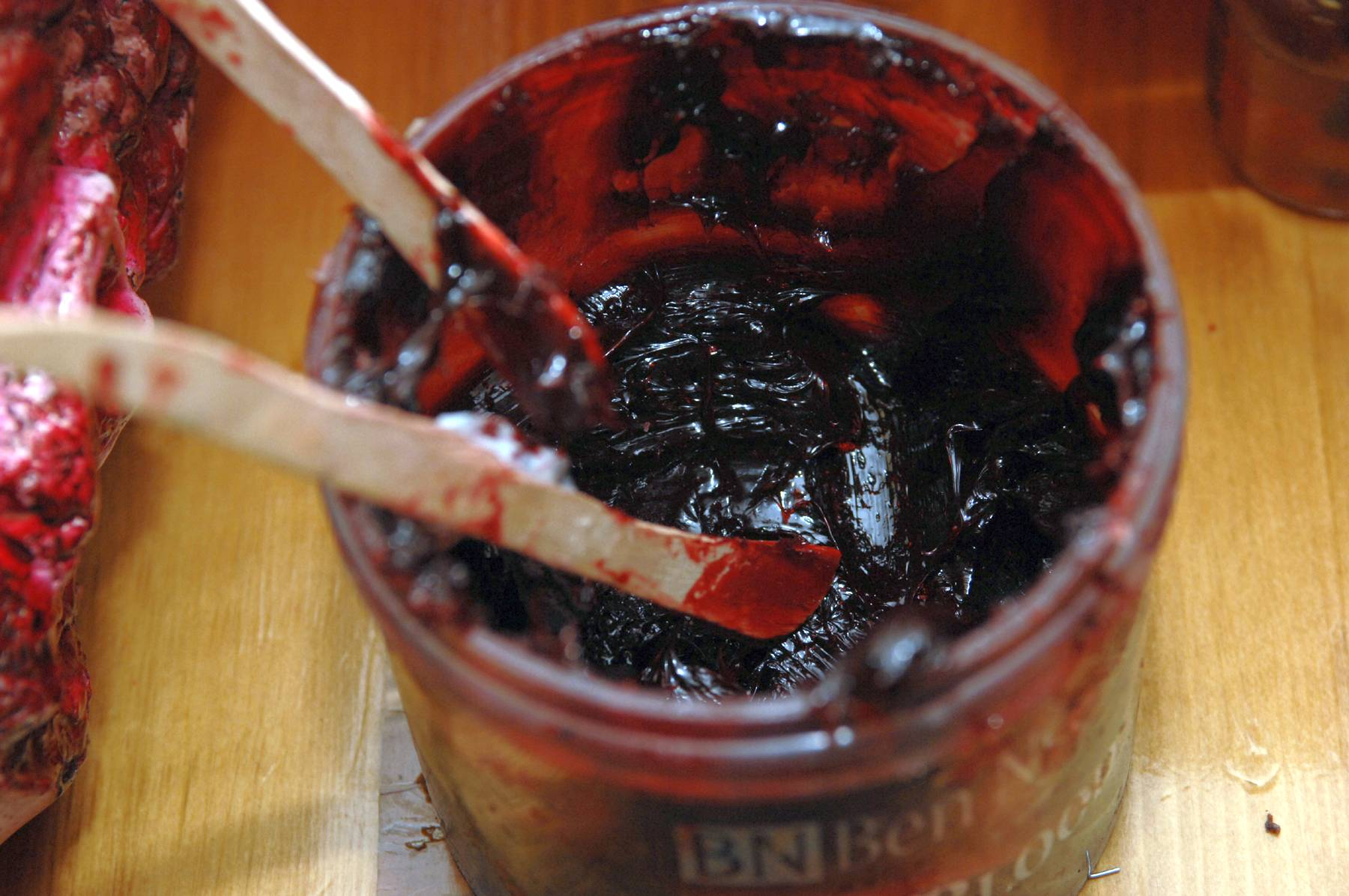
A jar of fake blood

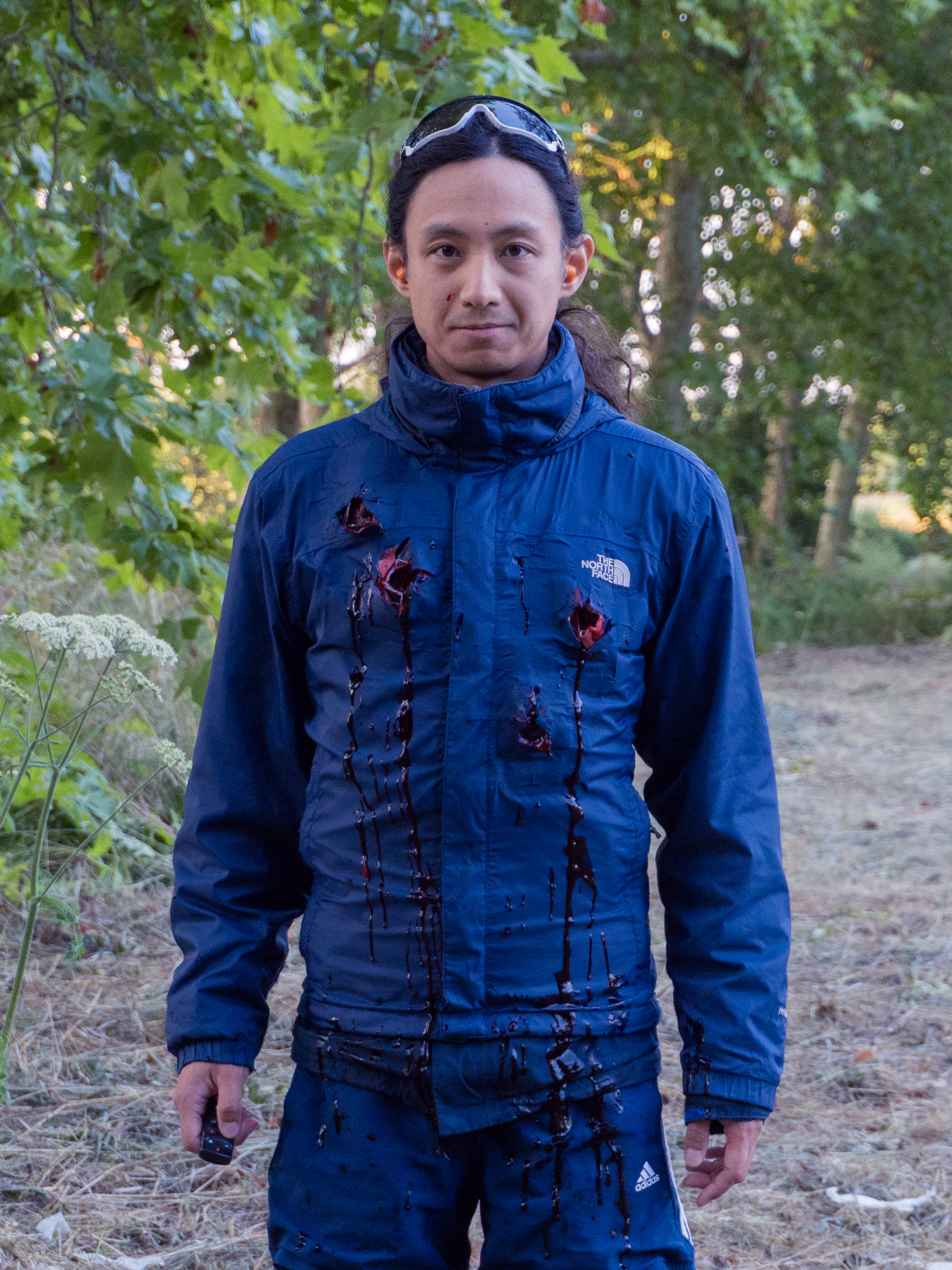
Aftermath of a bullet hit squib demonstration where several blood packs hidden in the actor's wardrobe blew open "bullet holes", bursting fake blood through and subsequently running down the jacket.

Fake blood can be made in many different ways. One of the cheapest and easiest can be made with varying recipes including corn syrup and food dye. For example, in the movie The Evil Dead the makers used a mixture consisting of corn syrup, food colouring, and instant coffee. Fake blood is used in nearly every, if not every single, movie that has shown bodily mutilation, be it human or otherwise. Some effective uses of fake blood include use of a bullet hit squib, or small explosive device, with a metal plate between the actor and the squib and a packet of fake blood to simulate the blood splatter that would accompany a gunshot for example. Another used for fake blood is seen in the movie Martin when the main character cuts the wrist of a girl. This trick is accomplished by hiding a syringe or bulb behind the fake weapon and squeezing out the fake blood as the weapon is drawn across the victim.

=== Scar effects ===
Fake scars can be made in many different ways. Actor Lon Chaney used collodion. In more recent years, with the advent of latex and plastics there are many ways to make fake flesh and scarring.

=== Burns ===
Burns are used in many films and correct technique can create a more effective visual. For first degree burns, merely put down a red foundation with a little purple on top. Use skin colored powder to prevent the “burn” from shining. For a second degree burn create fake blistering surrounded by the standard first degree reddening. To create the blistering, you can use petroleum jelly in saran wrap, or using pure gum latex and lifting the center after drying. Third degree burns are severe and should reflect that in the effect. The skin is charred and broken. This effect can be achieved with the latex, plastic wax material, or other plastic appliance. Be sure to color the burned flesh convincingly, then gradient from third degree burn, to second degree to first.

=== Latex ===
Latex is a synthetic rubber often used in special effects. Foamed latex is sometimes considered the "ultimate in prosthetic appliance." It can be used in an inflatable bladder effect to make it seem like the actor's skin is moving or rippling like Rick Baker's werewolf change effect An American Werewolf in London. This is accomplished by covering an inflatable balloon of some type underneath a covering made of latex, urethane, or plastic molding. Latex can also be used to make scar effects or other more blatant mutilation. For example, with latex prosthetics, movie makers can make an actor appear to have more or less limbs than he should. They can also make the actor appear to be horribly wounded with flesh hanging and large gashes. To accomplish these tricks, the actor must first have a mold made of the part of him that will be replicated using latex. Take, as an example, one of the zombies in Dawn of the Dead. To make this actor seem to be rotting, they need to make a cast. The technicians prep the area of the body, say the face, to be cast. They must cover the hair and coat the eyebrows, eyelashes, and any other hair that can't be covered with petroleum jelly. Then they must apply the alginate or other comparable substance, completely covering the molding area, keeping the mouth, nose, or both open for breathing. When that is finished, they layer the area with plaster bandages to create the cast. When all of it has dried and settled, they remove the cast from the actor and put it together again to create the mold. After this, they pour plaster of Paris into the mold to create a cast that is exactly like the actors face. From the cast they can get another mold which they then can use to sculpt any prosthetic attachments they need. This can include fake limbs, fake skin, or growths. It is important to use the a good adhesive to apply the prosthetic. In his book Vincent Kehoe recommends one that is "easy to apply, set[s] rapidly, be dilutable for use, and be removable with a solvent that is not harmful to the skin.
