= Dead-character costume =

Stage clothing distressed for stunts

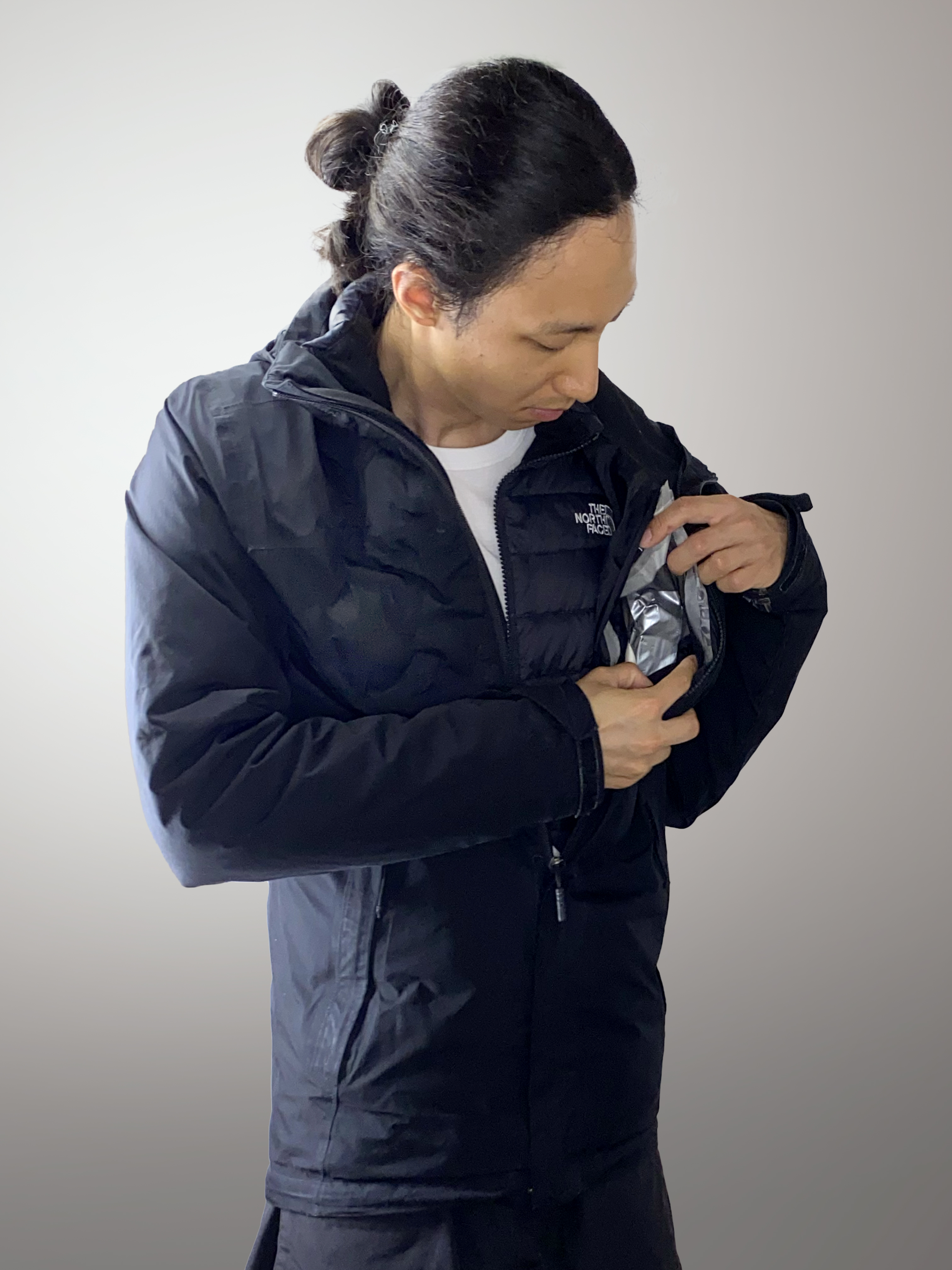
An actor wearing a specially modified jacket revealing two hidden squibs attached on the inside, while the outlines of three more squibs are visible on the right chest. A labelled image and demonstration of this jacket are shown below.

A dead-character costume is a set of stage clothes specially designed or modified for actors portraying characters killed on screen or on stage. They are used to depict gunshot or stab wounds, damage and the visual aftermath of violence, and are usually prepared by integrating special-effect devices such as blood squibs or prosthetics. Despite the character being "killed" only once on-screen, multiple identical costumes are typically used for several takes and scenes to ensure consistency and continuity, as the irreversible damage caused by squibs or blood effects limit their reusability. They are sent to separate costume racks and disposed of afterwards, unlike other clothing articles that may return to the costume shop. These costumes serve as a metaphorical canvas to portray injury and death without the need for digital post-production effects.

== Costume considerations ==
Costume selection should consider script requirements, possibility for modification, aesthetics, and budget. If fake blood is used, the outfit's colour should be bright or have sufficient set lighting to show bloodstains. Typically, 3-6 or even 8 identical stunt pieces are modified for the planned takes, rehearsals, backups and tests, and one hero piece without modifications is used for close-ups and prior scenes. Sufficient duplicates ensure smooth execution.

== Costumes used for bullet hit squibs ==
A dead-character costume is one of the most significant components of a blood squibs effect, especially in action or crime scenes that involve gunfire. These squibs simulate a burst of a bullet wound and a fake blood packet hidden beneath the costume. Designated areas of the fabric where the squibs are placed are first weakened (often by legislation) by cutting, sanding, scoring, grating or plunging a scoring tool, and sometimes, they are cut open from the inside to affix the squibs. As a result, spare or unused costumes are usually unsalvageable.

Example of identical sets of scrubs used for a movie scene

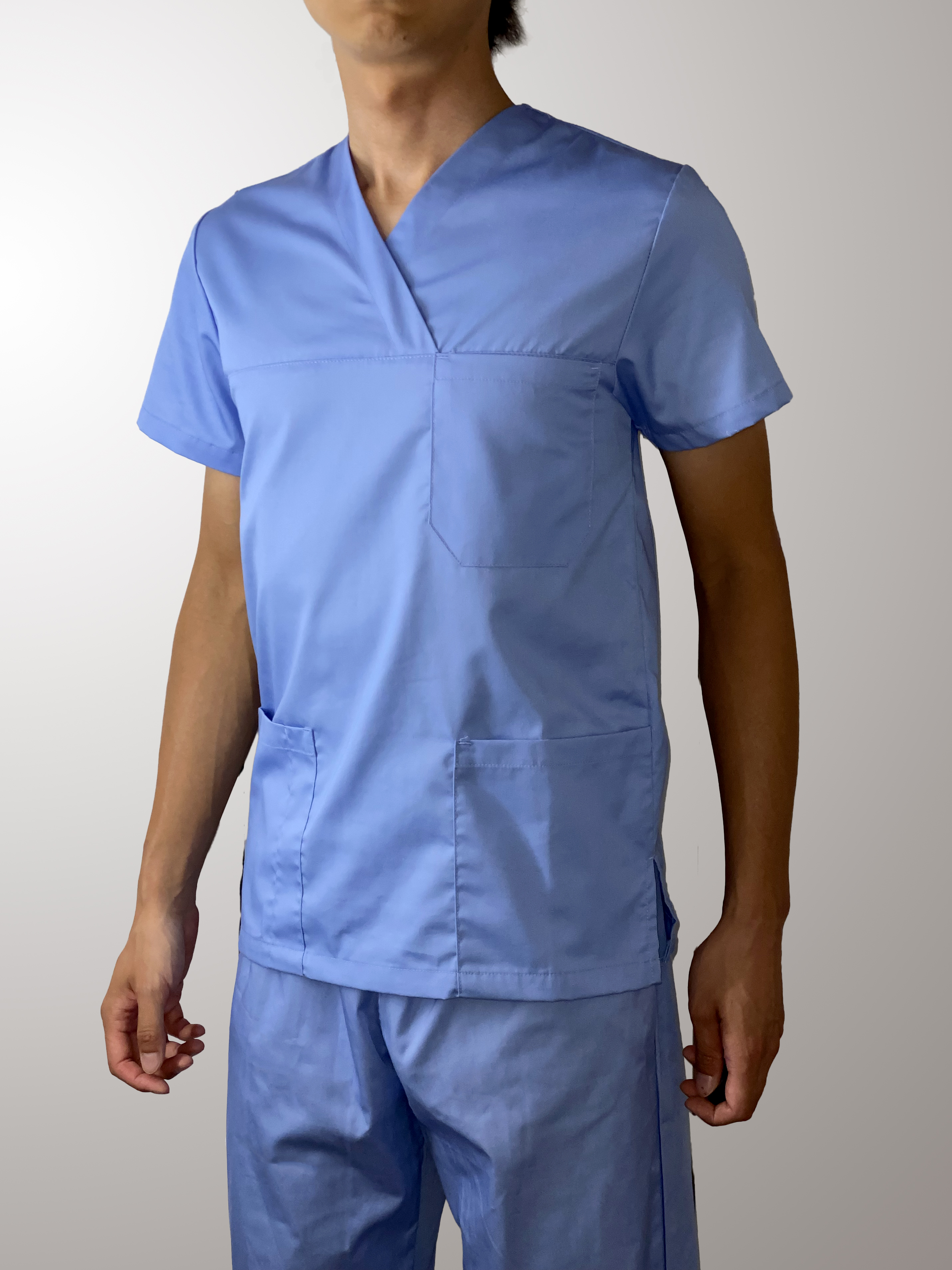
The non-modified hero piece, for use in most scenes where the character appears.

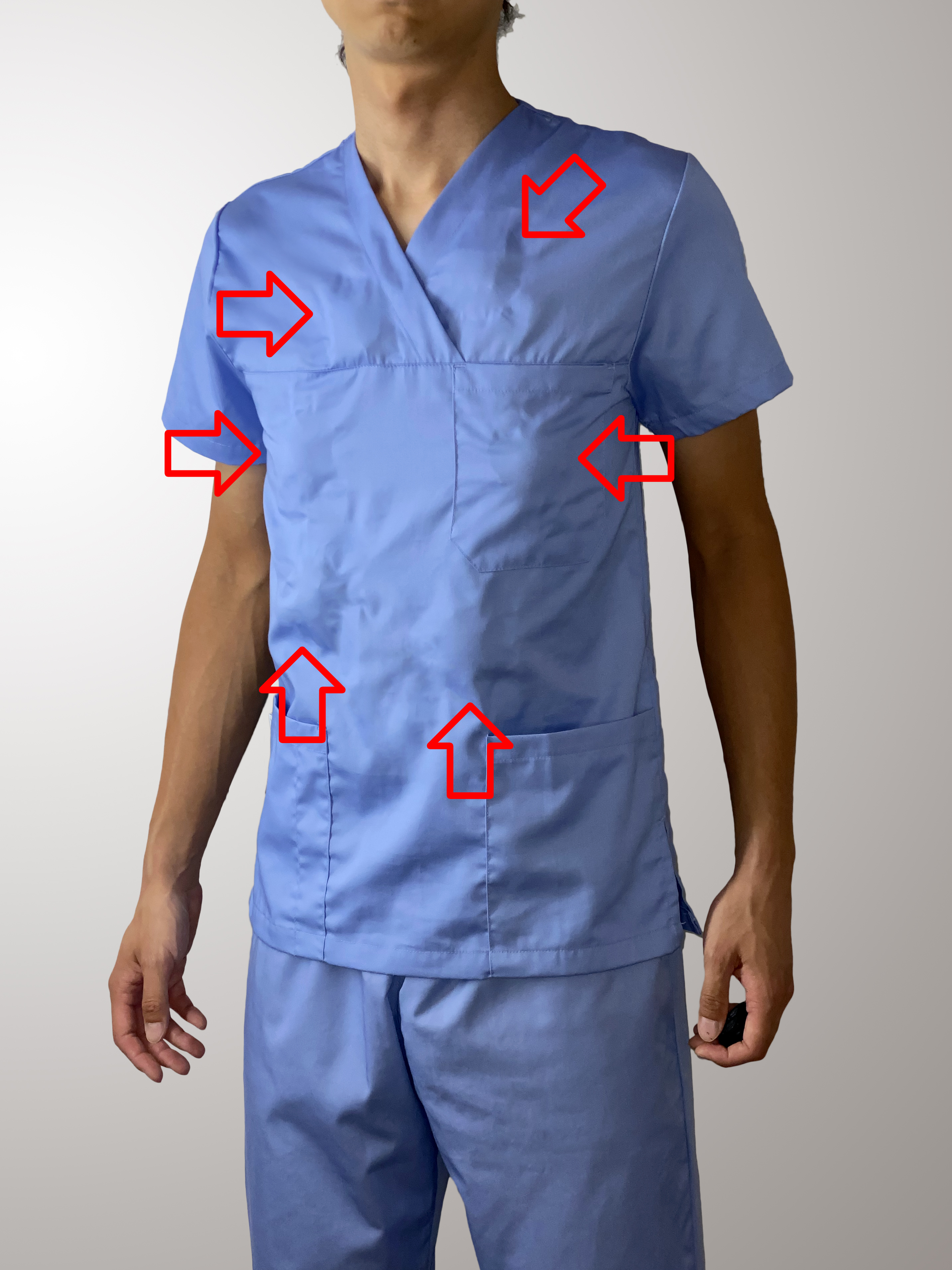
The stunt piece with 6x squibs, filled with 15 g of fake blood, showing minor bulges on the fabric.

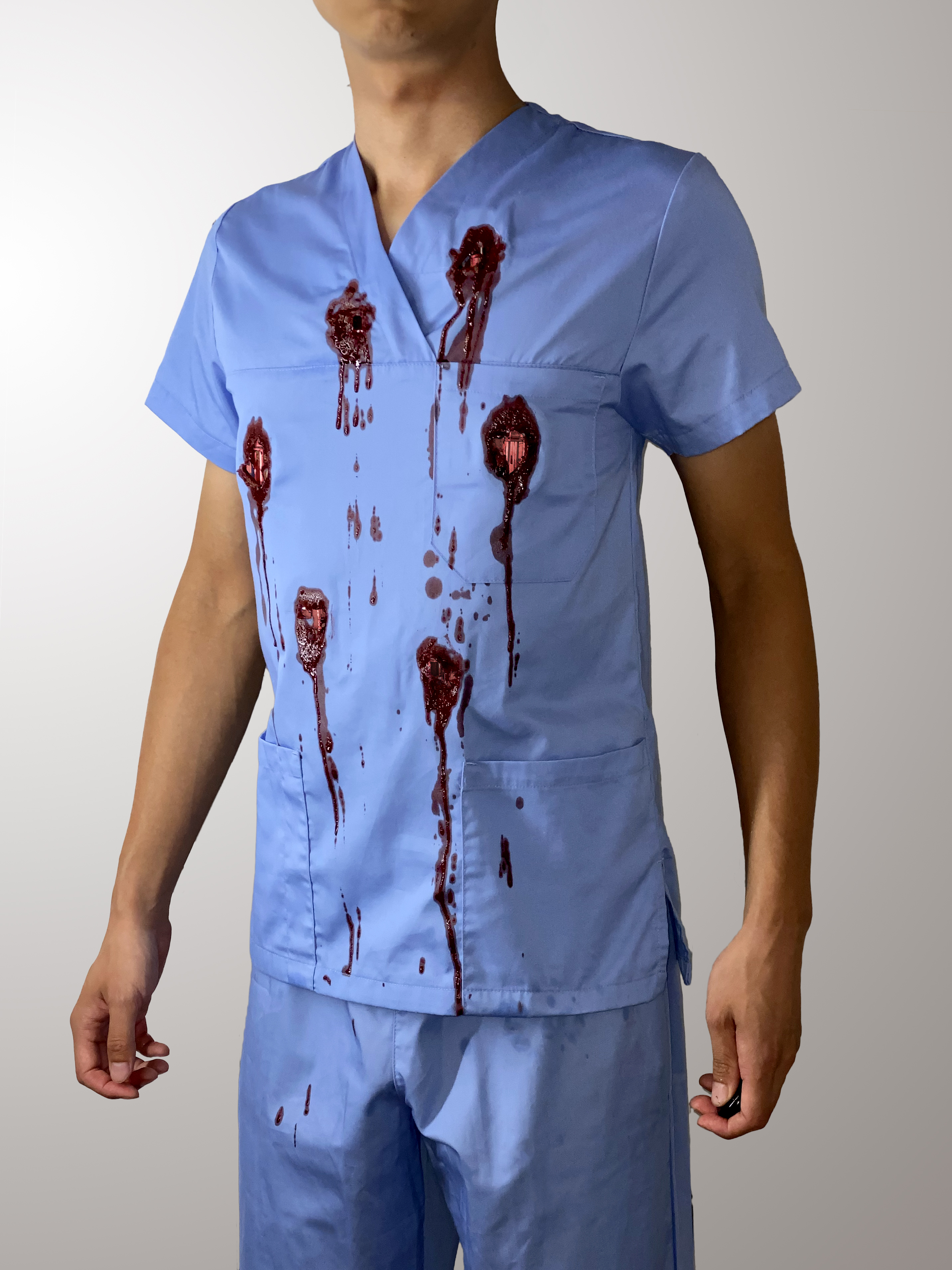
The stunt piece after the scene with blown open "bullet holes" and fake blood.

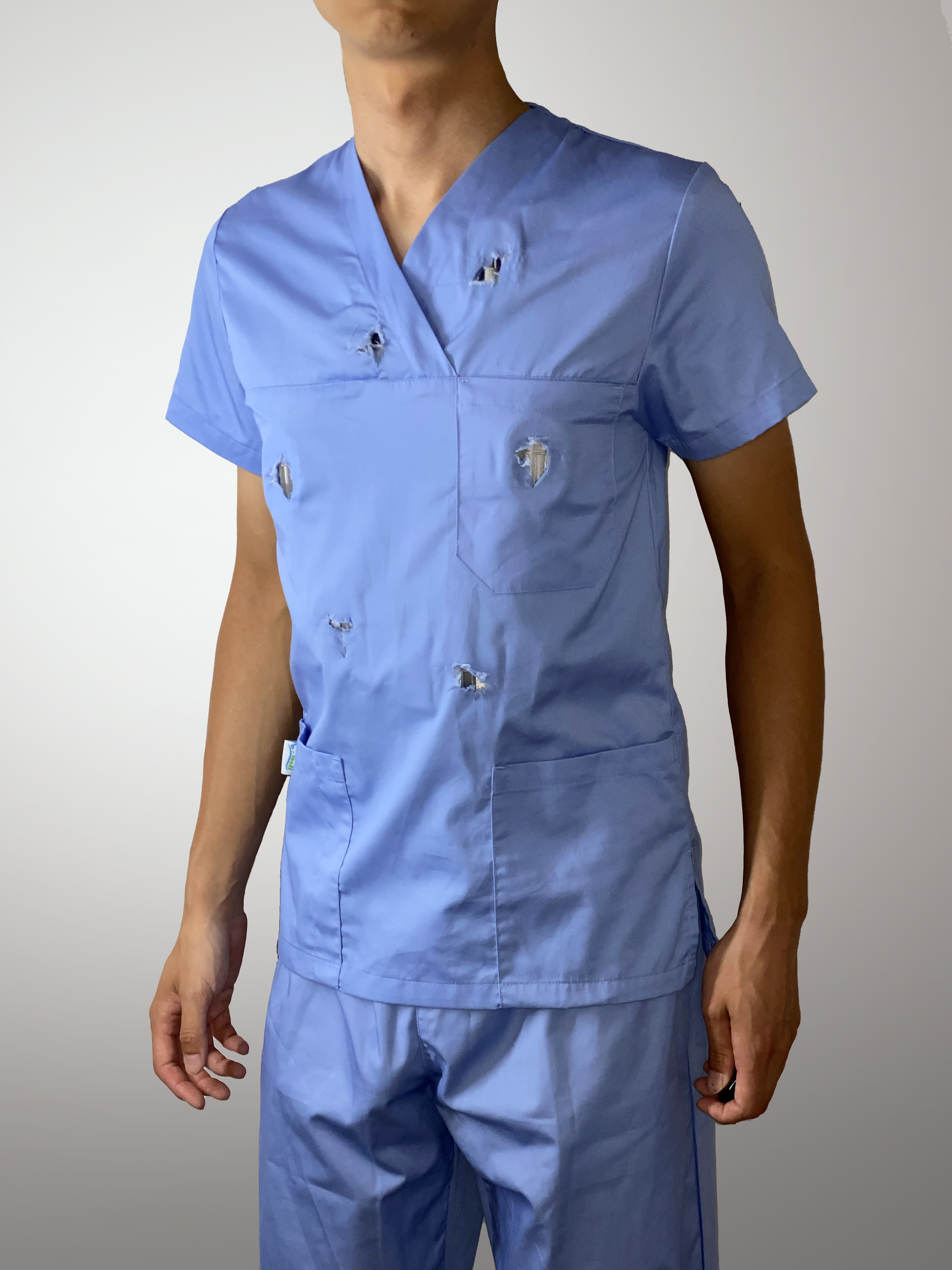
The second stunt piece after laundering, showing holes left by the squibs.

=== Preparation of the costume ===
The preparation of a dead-character costume involves determining the number, sequence, and location of bullet holes (~50 mm diameter) based on the script. To maintain an intact appearance from a distance, the area is weakened and glued or taped to create realistic fraying when the squibs trigger. Squib assemblies, which are large and heavy, are securely attached to the inside of the costume to ensure the blood effect is directed outward. The lining and filling may be modified to reduce bulk, though multiple squibs can still add significant weight and unnatural bulges, affecting movement and appearance. Costumers aim to minimise visibility of squib placements, with subtle scoring or stippling techniques and using post-production to erase visible bullet holes before the squibs are fired.

In some cases, jackets with multiple frontal squibs are fitted with an additional rear zipper, allowing actors to wear them from the back to minimise disturbance to the squibs. Fastening all closures is crucial for both visual consistency and safety, as it prevents the squibs from being exposed or aiming in unintended directions.

Preparation of a dead character costume for bullet hit squibs

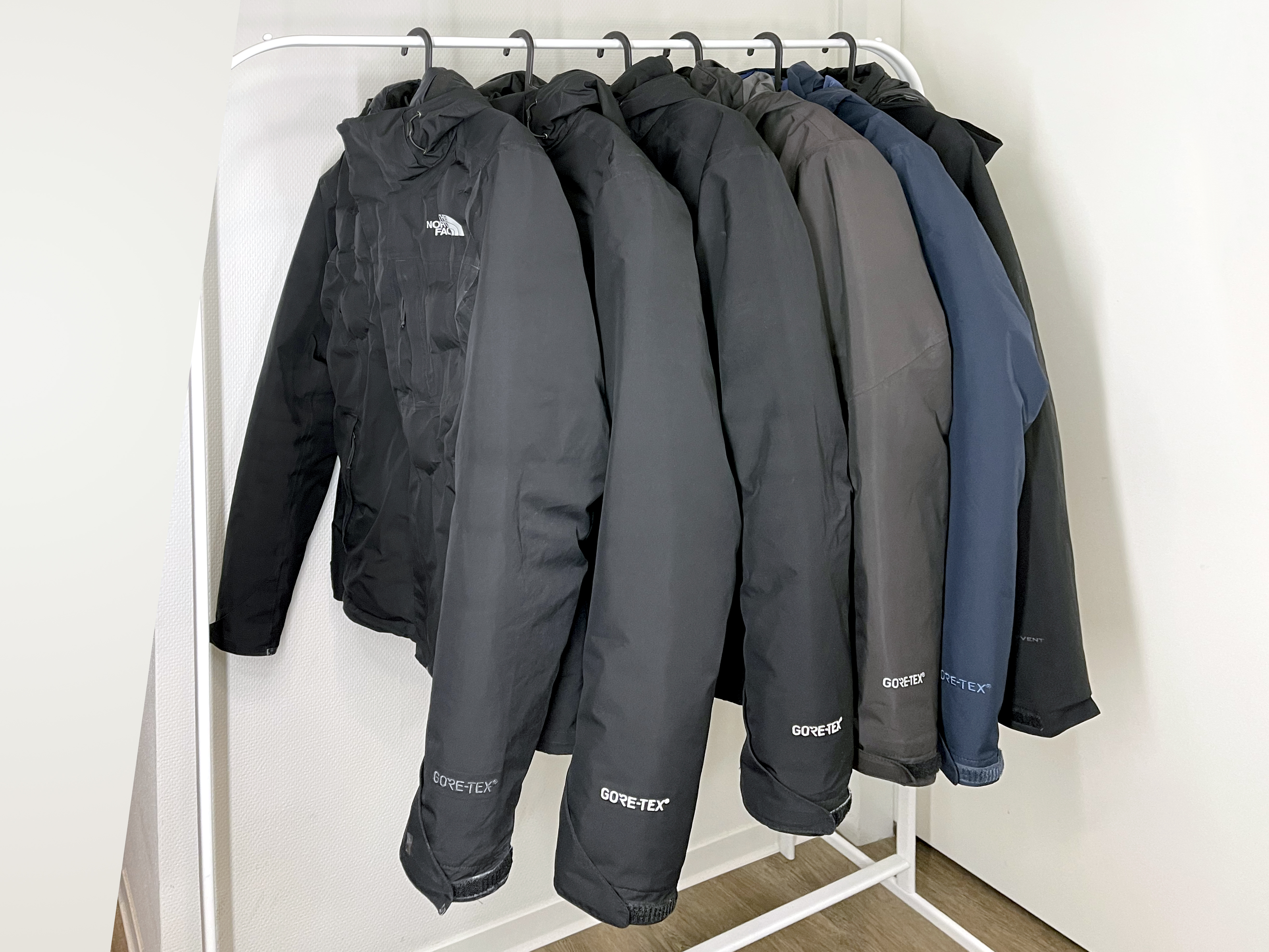
6x identical jackets (albeit different colours) are budgeted for a movie scene with bullet hit squibs.

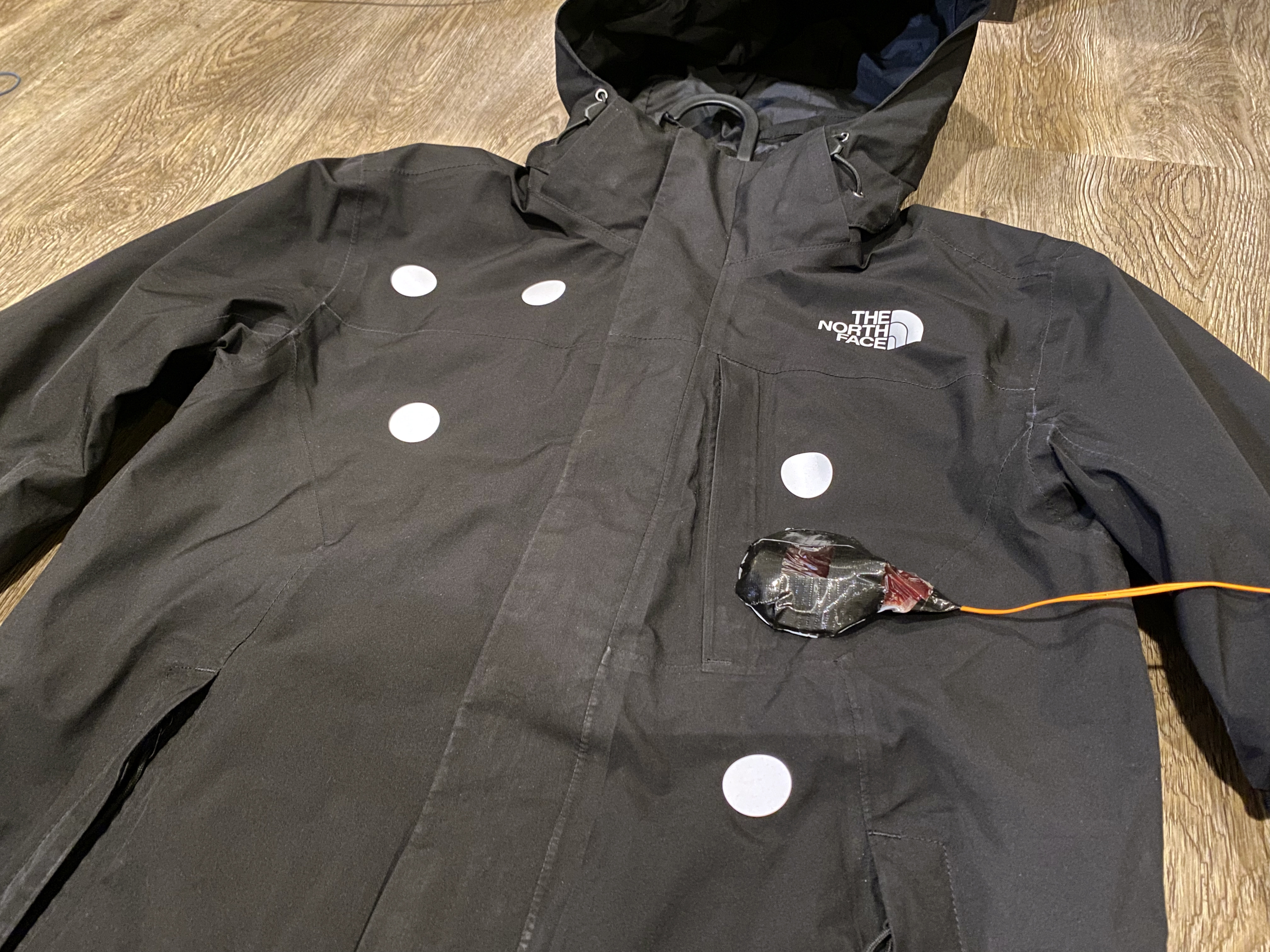
Bullet hit locations marked out with white stickers. The trigger sequence and the camera angles should also be determined. A completed squib is placed temporarily on the costume for reference.

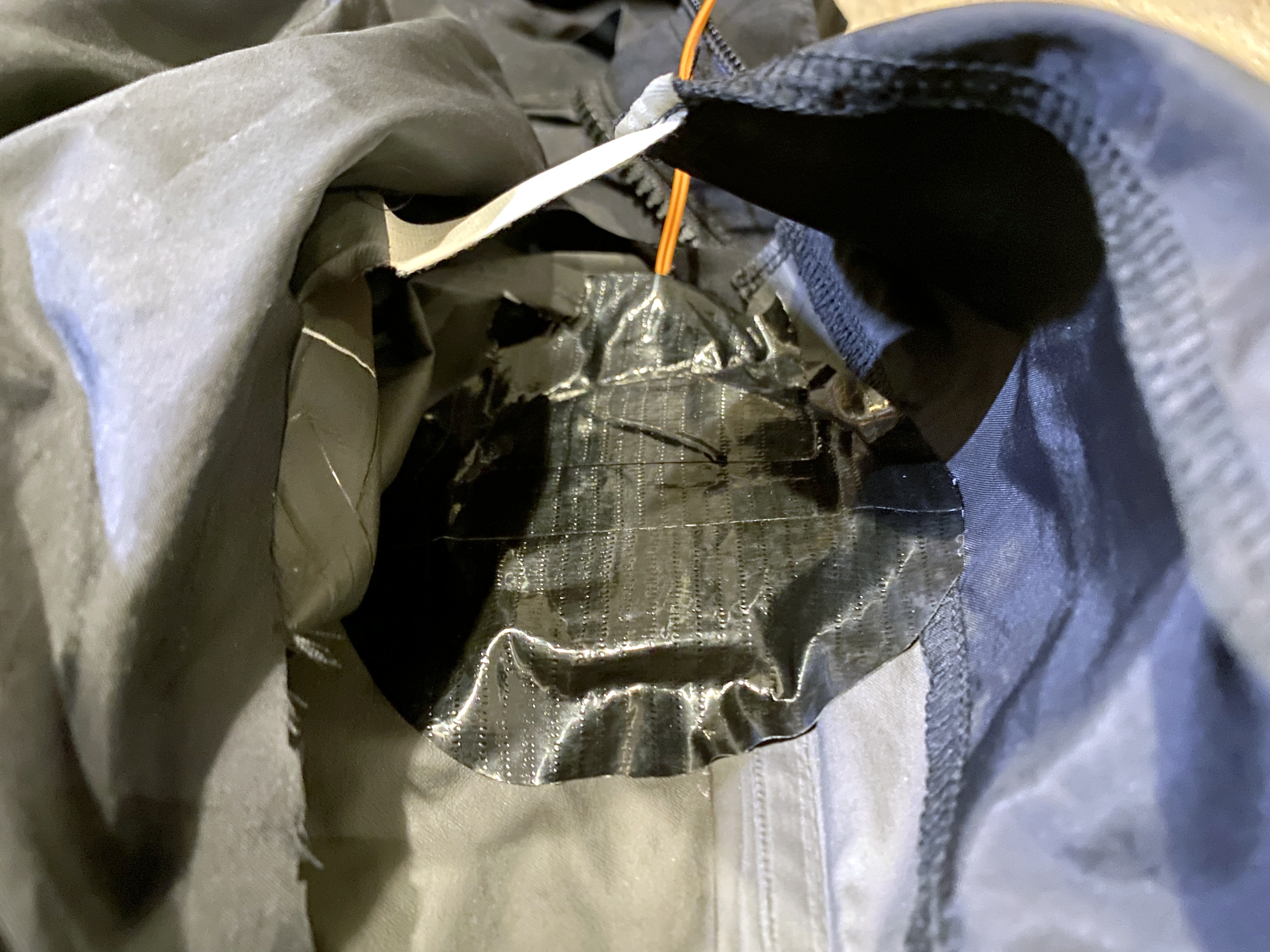
The inner taffeta lining cut open, exposing the outermost fabric from the inside. The squib device is then aligned to the weakened area and attached with duct tape.

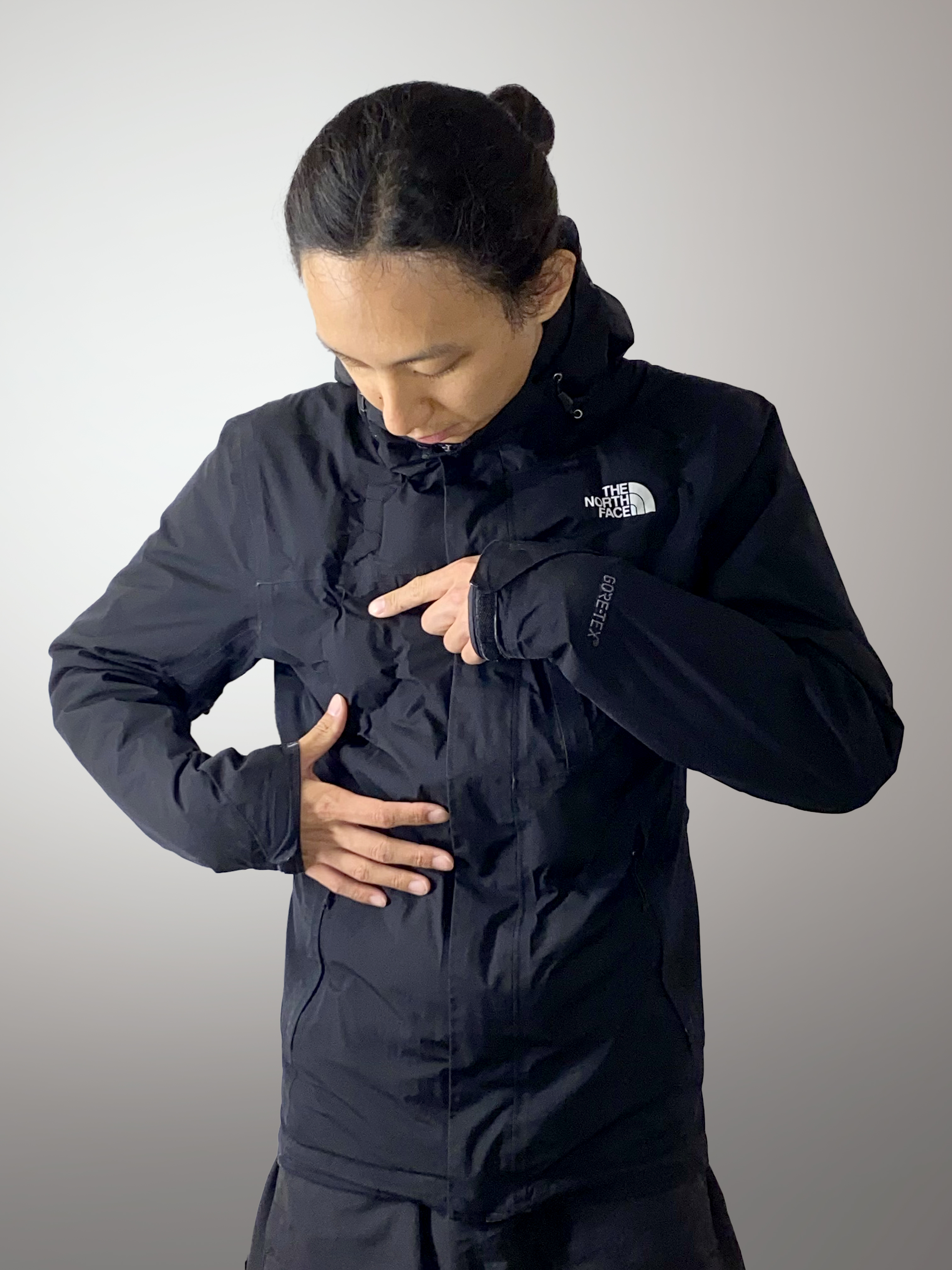
An actor wearing a modified jacket and points to the embedded bullet hit squib.

=== Reusing or salvaging dead-character costumes ===
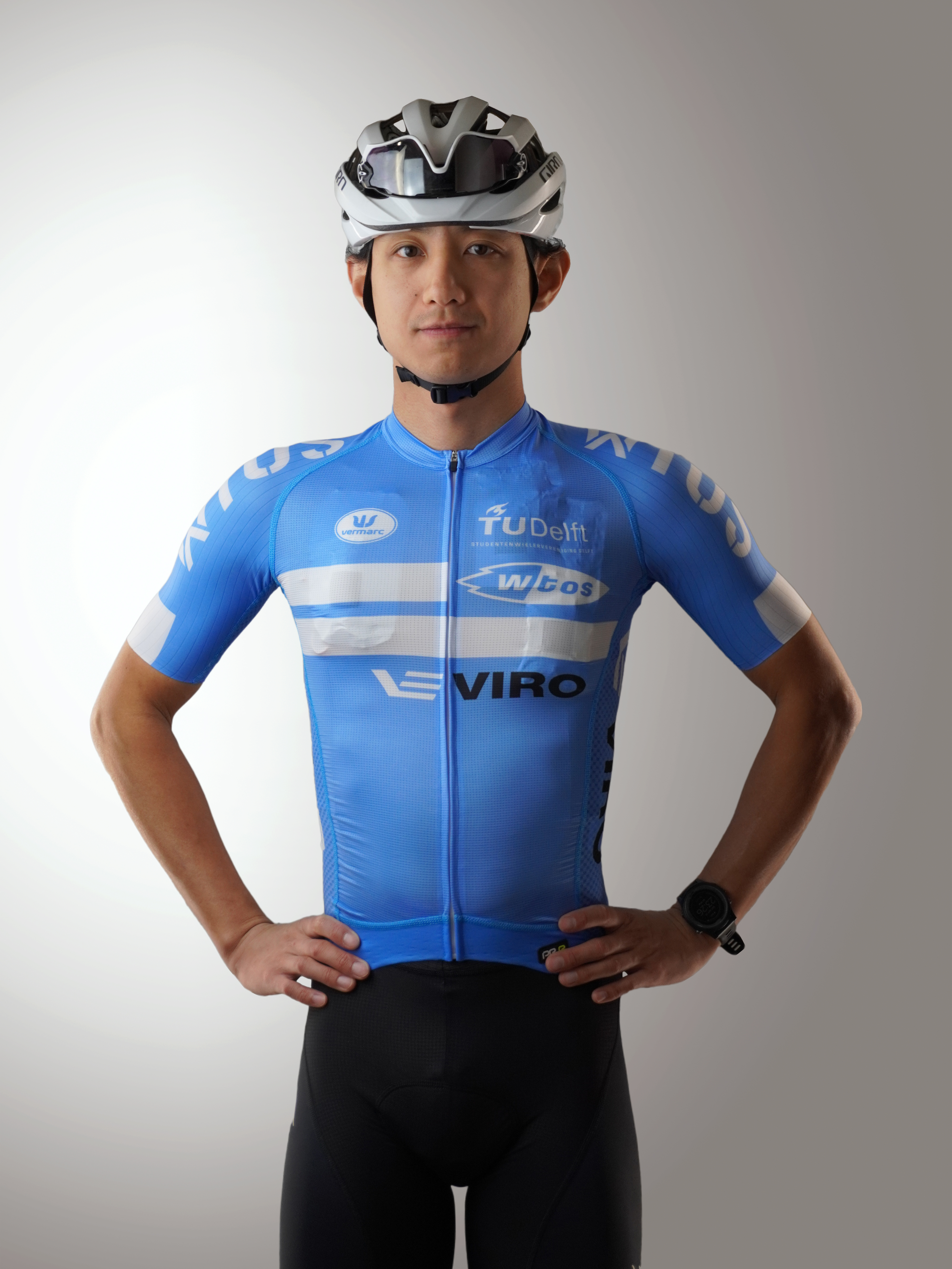
An actor portraying a road cyclist with three concealed bullet hit squibs positioned beneath his jersey for a stunt, preserving the fabric's integrity without weakening.

Producing convincing bullet hit squib effects often requires a substantial wardrobe budget, though some costumes can be reused or salvaged. Thin fabrics, like cycling jerseys, where a squib can easily blow open the thin fabric, can be used for a blood squib stunt without weakening the fabric and unused spares can be salvaged. More durable clothing, such as jackets (e.g. waterproof, parka and down), can be reused across several takes, thus reducing the number of duplicates. Bullet holes are completely cut open and loosely glued or taped back together, as shown in the demonstration image in the gallery. Between takes, blood squibs are replaced, and the jacket is wiped clean again. Other advantages of using a jacket as a dead character costume include:

- the insulation provides additional padding
- versatility in many scripts
- easy to hide multiple squibs, wiring and equipment
- more sophisticated appearance
- comfortable for extended filming or performing periods

The main disadvantage is that this requires more time for resets between takes.

Specific modifications for a down jacket, such as repacking down fillings in a taffeta pocket or a plastic pouch, help maintain their puffy appearance.

Using non-staining simulants (e.g. water) during rehearsals or dry simulants (e.g. dust, powder) also facilitates cleanup.

Bullet hit squibs on a waterproof down jacket

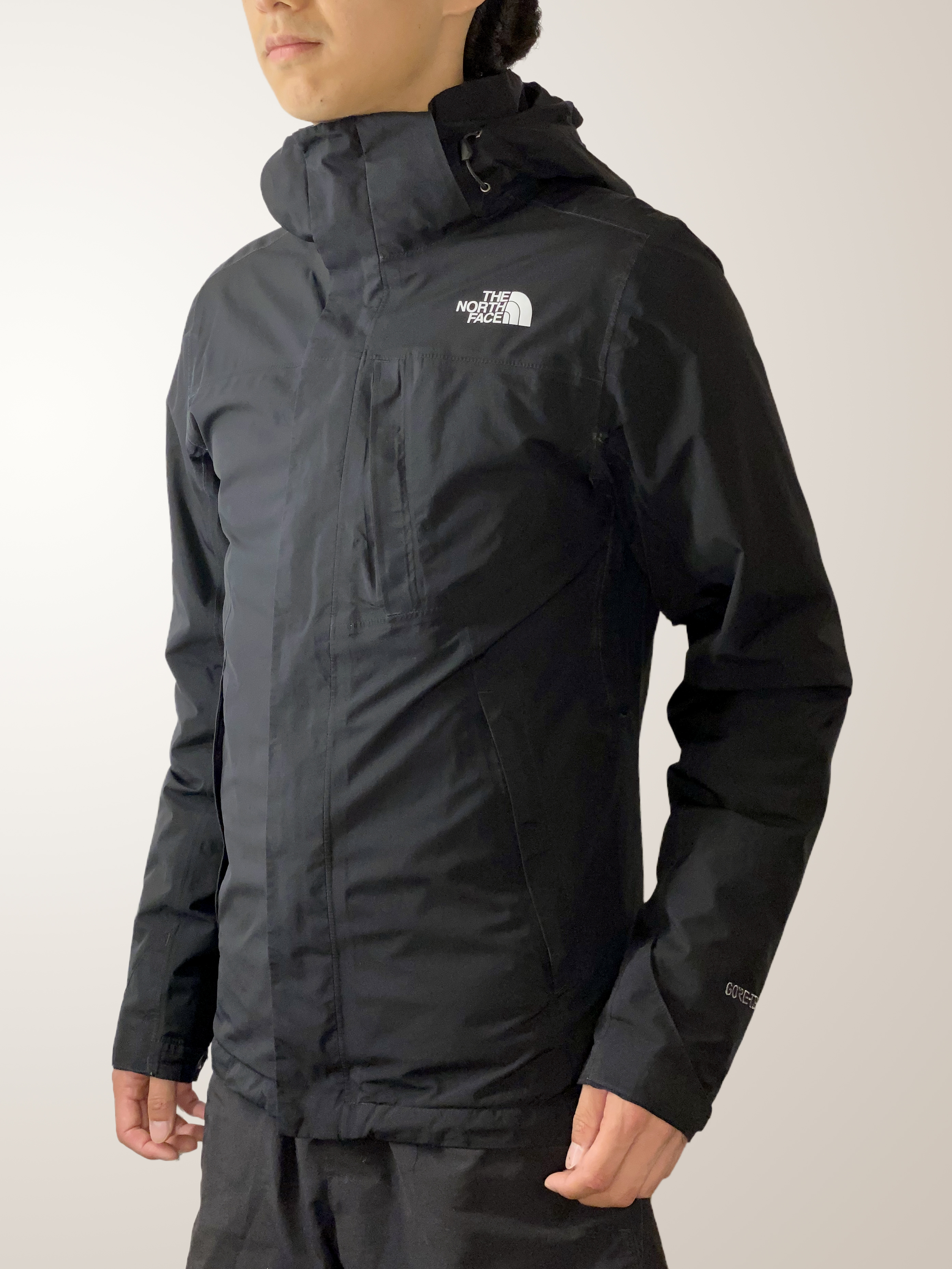
The hero jacket without any modifications used for all scenes except when the actor is "shot".

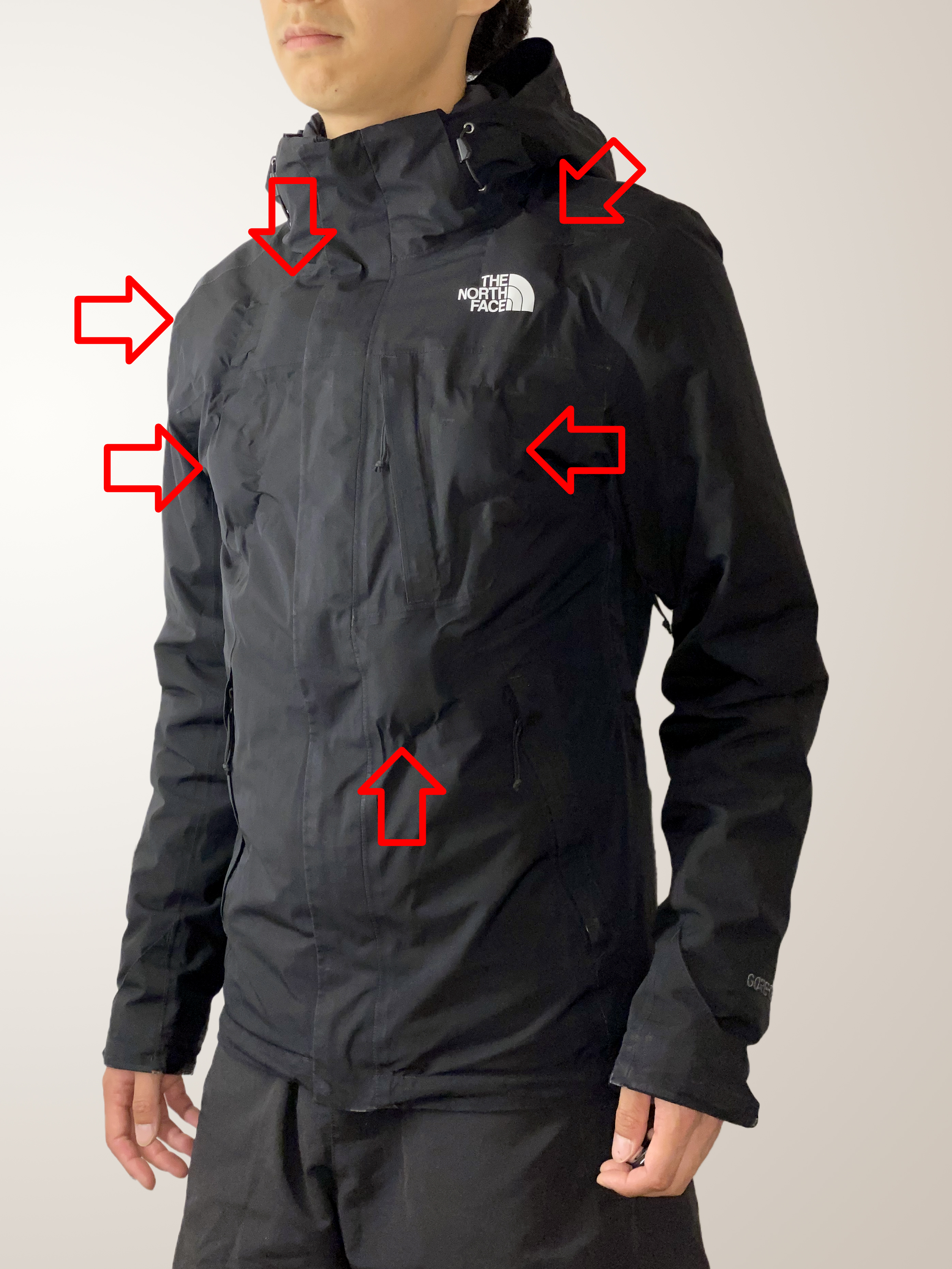
The first stunt jacket with 6x bullet hit squibs (labelled) containing 25 g of fake blood and a modest bulge.

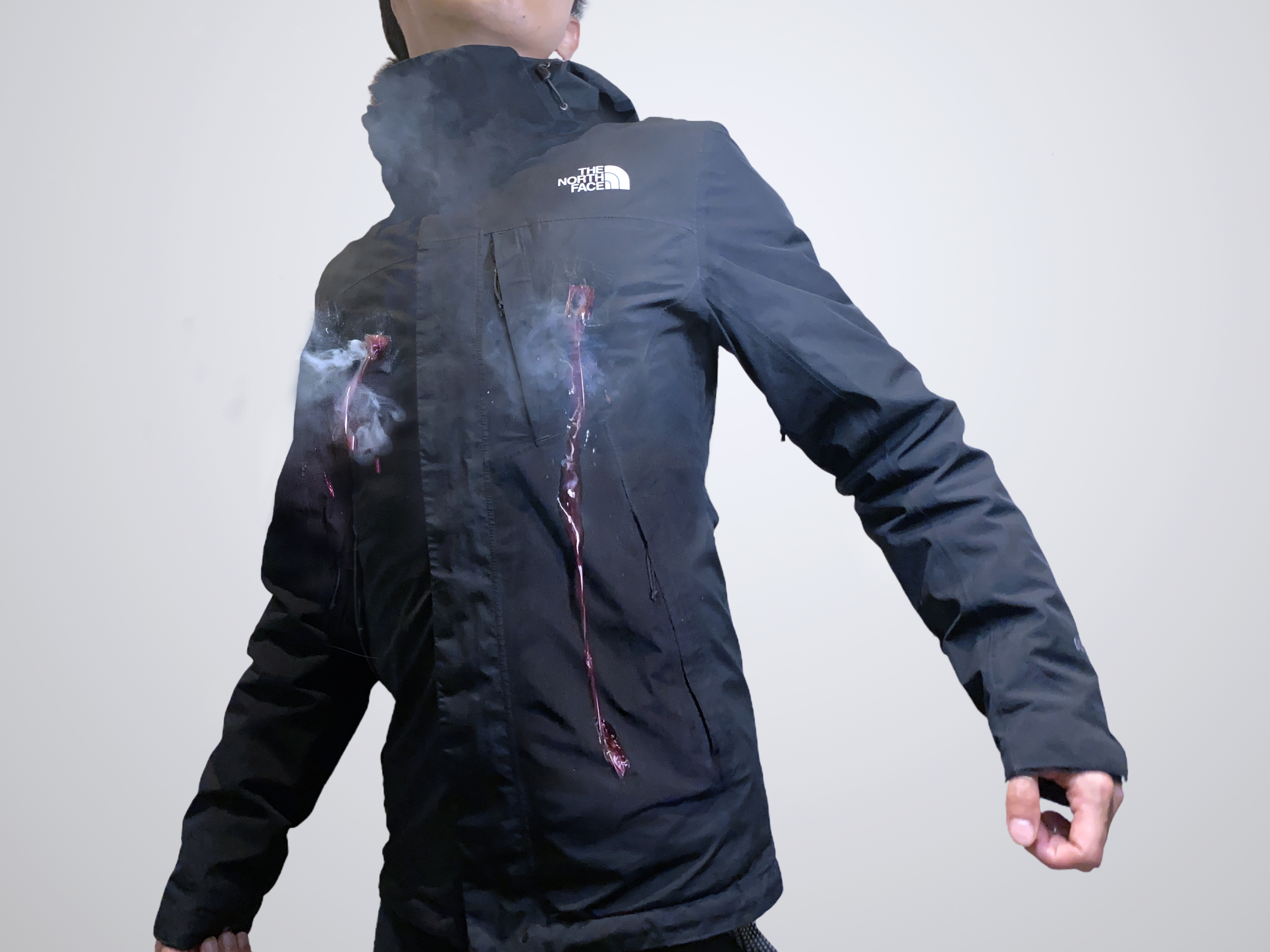
The second stunt piece with 2x squibs exploding on the chest and cleanly cut bullet holes for a demonstration.

When costumes cannot be altered or damaged, realistic blood stains can be achieved using acrylic painted nylon tulle mesh and added ripped fabric material for bullet hole textures. This method allows repositioning before sewing and removal after production for costume reuse. However, it does not replicate the blood spray effect of a bullet hit squib, potentially requiring CGI to achieve this effect.

=== Performing with bullet hit squibs ===
Bullet hit squibs on a down jacket in the film Sara. One hero down jacket (frame 1) and two stunt pieces (frames 2–4 and 5–6) were used for the down jacket. Slight misalignment of gunshot wounds on the chest is visible between the two stunt jackets. The first stunt jacket likely underwent several takes, with the bullet hole visible in frame 2 and refilled down feathers in frame 4. The second stunt jacket was used in frames 5–6, with a precut + shaped bullet hole seen in frame 5 before bursting in frame 6. This is also one of the few instances of using down feathers to achieve the gunshot wound aesthetic on a down jacket.

Costume containing blood squibs and equipment is visibly bulkier and heavier, which requires care during dressing and performance to avoid damaging the squibs. For safety reasons, it is generally advised to change into the dead character costume immediately before the shot to prevent accidental triggering or equipment malfunction, unless practical reasons necessitate switching from the hero costume to the stunt version earlier.

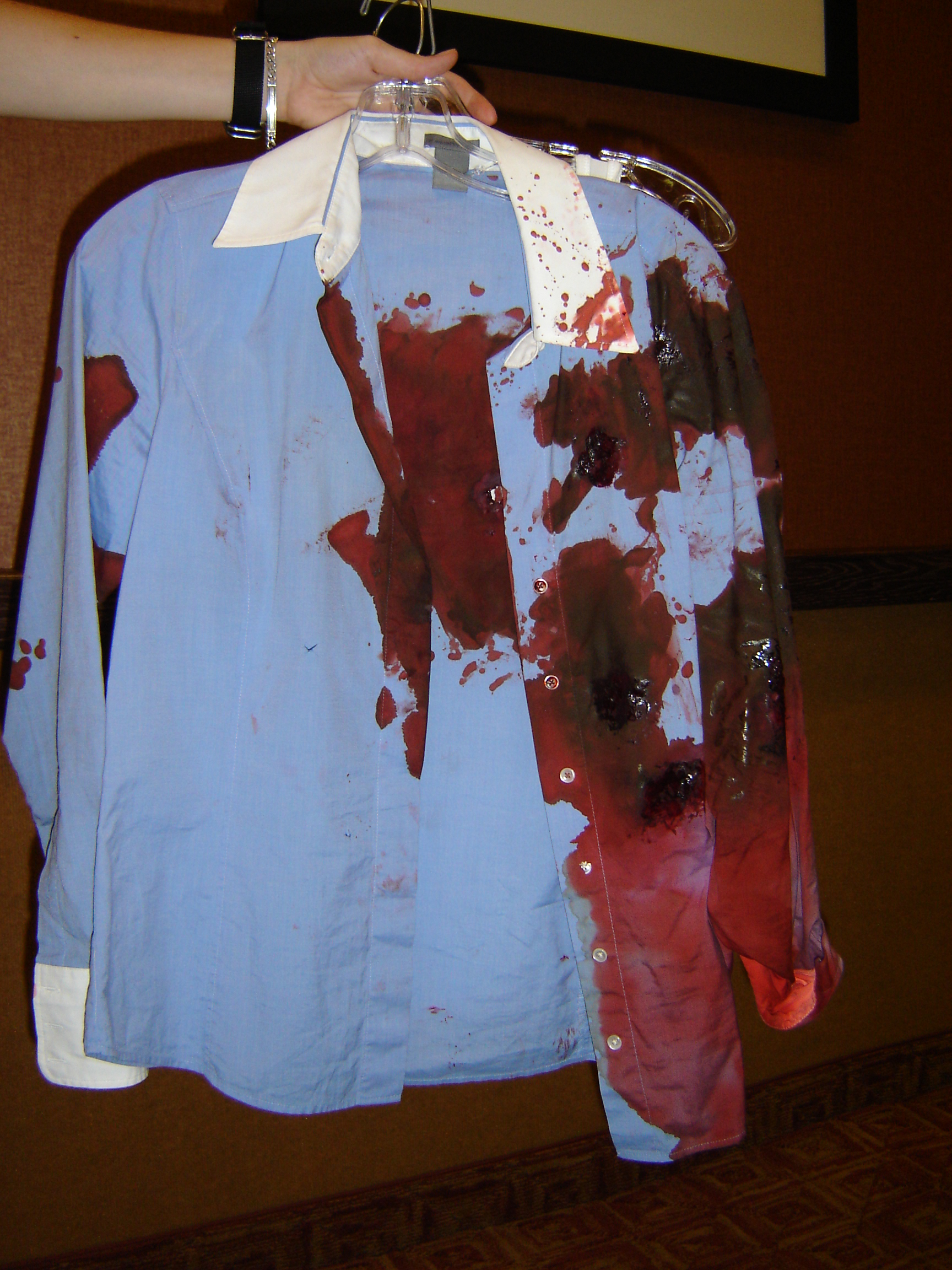
Fired squibs on a shirt worn during the death of a character in an episode of the US police drama NCIS

== Post-production ==
Spent and unspent costumes, whether salvageable or not, are kept until post-production is complete in case additional footage is needed. This ensures that all necessary footage is captured and allows for reshoots if required. Afterwards, they can become souvenirs, be auctioned as memorabilia, repaired, or donated depending on the production's needs. An example is winter coats with bullet holes that have been repaired and donated.

== See also ==
- Bodily mutilation in film
- Practical effect
- Pyrotechnics
- Squib (explosive)
