= Theatrical blood =

Substitute for blood in a theatrical or cinematic performance

The bloodred color of iron thiocyanate can simulate the appearance of blood.

Theatrical blood, stage blood or fake blood is anything used as a substitute for blood in a theatrical or cinematic performance. For example, in the special effects industry, when a director needs to simulate an actor being shot or cut, a wide variety of chemicals and natural products can be used. The most common is red food coloring, often inside small balloons coupled with explosive devices called squibs.

== Reasons for use ==
There are many reasons for substituting for real blood in the film industry, such as ethical and sanitary concerns, and concerns for the emotional well being of the actors. Also, actual blood's tendency to coagulate and solidify quickly makes it unsuitable for repeated takes without freshening; The longer-lasting viscosity of stage blood makes it far easier to work with on the set.

== Typical recipe ==
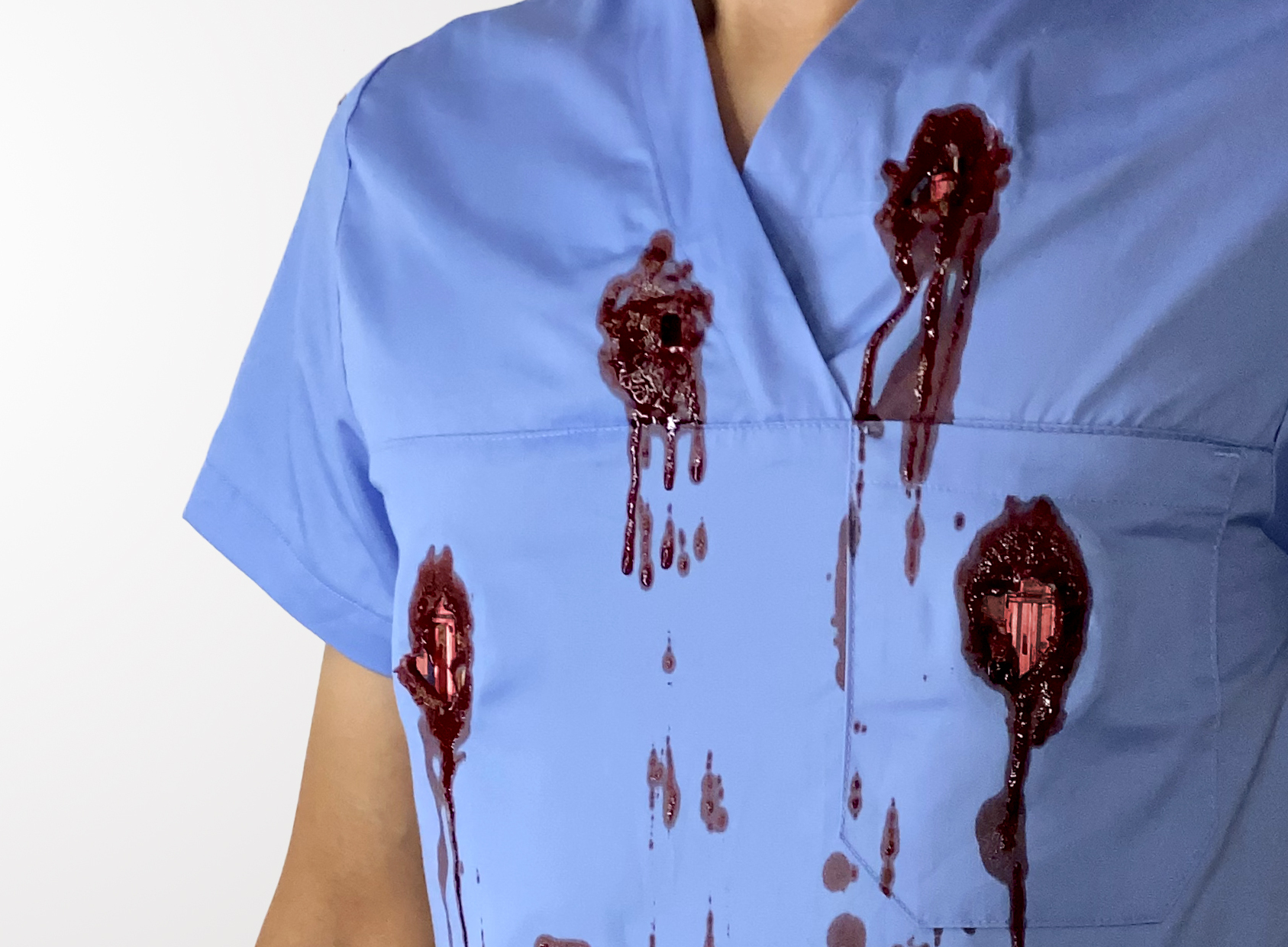
Fired squibs on a costume spilling fake blood containing water, cherry sauce, red food colouring and an opacifier.

Fake blood generally consists of some or all of the following in various ratios (some ingredients render the solution inedible):

=== Primary ingredients ===
- Red food colouring as the main colour
- Water as the base

=== Secondary ingredients ===
==== Colour modifiers ====
- Blue and yellow food colouring to darken the tone
- Opacifier, e.g. titanium dioxide to make blood non-translucent

==== Viscosity enhancers ====
- Thickening agent, such as corn starch, flour or xanthan gum, which requires heating and may also act an opacifier
- Corn syrup (or plain syrup)
- Tomato ketchup, chocolate syrup and cherry or strawberry topping sauce which also add solid 'chunks' to the texture and deepens the red
- Glycerine provides a glossy, wet appearance

==== Other additives ====
- Dishwashing liquid, powder or laundry detergent to prevent the blood from beading and staining
- Preservatives such as sodium benzoate if the solution is to be stored for some time

Most recipes may cause staining, so they should be tested in advance and the wardrobe washed promptly after use.

In the 1960 film Psycho, Bosco Chocolate Syrup was used as fake blood. Since the film was in black and white, the color was less important than the consistency.

== Kensington Gore ==
"Kensington Gore" (a pun on the London place and street) was a trademark for fake blood used in films and in theatre. It was manufactured by a retired British pharmacist, John Tinegate or Tynegate, during the 1960s and 1970s, in the village of Abbotsbury, Dorset. Many varieties of blood, having various degrees of viscosity, shades and textures, were available. Since Tinegate's death, the name "Kensington Gore" has become a generic term for stage blood. Kensington Gore was used in the film The Shining.

== Other uses ==
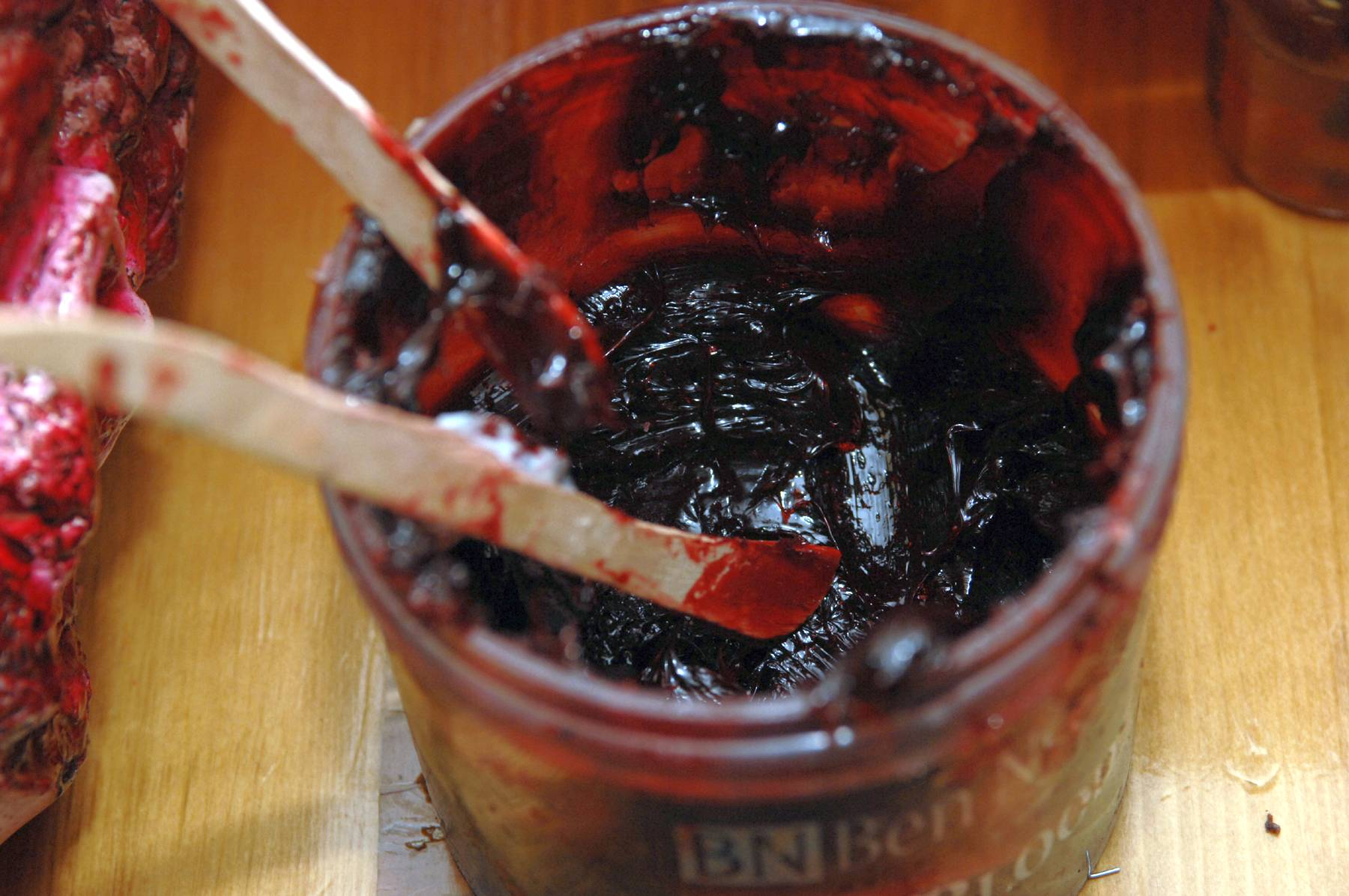
A jar of fake blood used for moulage medical training

Theatrical blood has other applications apart from its use in the film industry.

The crime scene investigation science of bloodstain pattern analysis uses stage blood or sometimes cow's blood in mock-up crime scenes when training new investigators.

The art of moulage uses theatrical blood in applying mock injuries for the purpose of training emergency response teams and other medical and military personnel.

Theatrical blood is also popularly used in Halloween costumes and haunted attractions such as haunted houses to portray injury, shot/stab wounds or special effects looks for the purpose of cosmetic entertainment. It is also used in certain horror-themed live action role-playing games.

== See also ==
- Blood substitute
- Blood squib
- Theatrical makeup
