= Headstamp =

Markings on the bottom of a cartridge case

A headstamp is the markings on the bottom of a cartridge case designed for a firearm. It usually tells who manufactured the case. If it is a civilian case it often also tells the caliber: if it is military, the year of manufacture is often added.

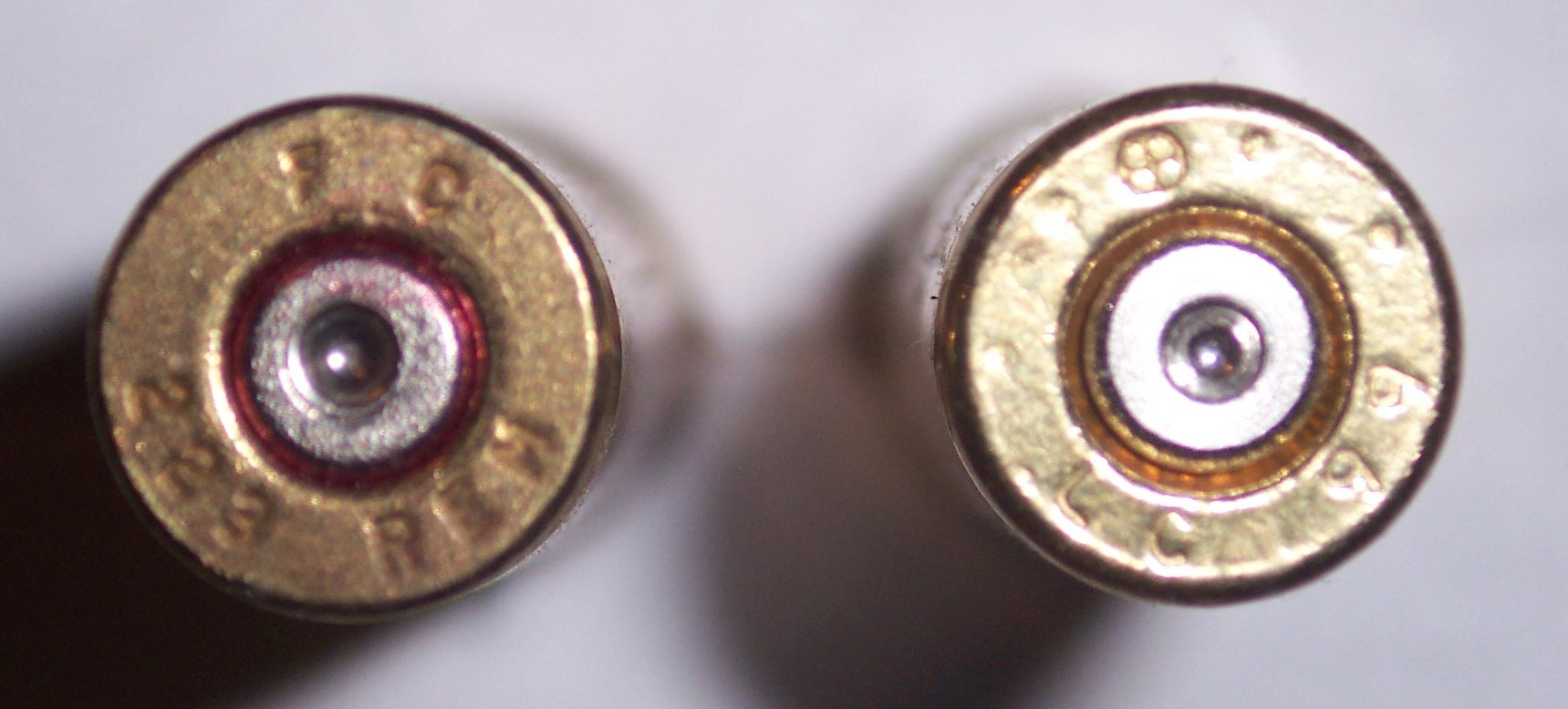
The left cartridge's headstamp says "FC 223 REM" which means that it was made by Federal Cartridge Co. and it is in the caliber ".223 Remington". The cartridge on the right has a headstamp that says "LC 99" with a symbol that consists of a cross in a circle. This cartridge was made in 1999 by the Lake City Army Ammunition Plant, in Independence, Missouri, USA. The symbol on this headstamp means it meets NATO specifications.

The headstamp is punched into the base of the cartridge during manufacture. A resource for identifying where the ammunition originated can be found at Cartridge Collectors.

== Albania ==
The government-operated arsenal K.M. Polican marks number "3" at the 6 o'clock position, and the last two digits of the year at 12 o'clock.

== Argentina ==
Military cartridges have the manufacturer's head stamp at 12 o’clock, and can include a two or four digit year. The following list of manufacturer initials is taken verbatim from:

FMMAP S.F. Fabrica Militar de Cartuchos y Armas Portatiles de San Francisco ("Military Cartridge & Small Arms Factory - San Francisco") (1948-1954)

  - FMCSF ("Military Cartridge Factory - San Francisco") (1954-1972)
  - F.M. S.F. Fabrica Militar -San Francisco ("Military Factory - San Francisco") (1972-?)

F.M.M.A.P. Fabrica Militar de Municiones y Armas Portatiles ("Military Munitions & Small Arms Factory") (1939–44).

  - F.M.M.A.P. B Fabrica Militar de Municiones y Armas Portatiles — Borghi ("Military Munitions & Small Arms Factory at Borghi") (1944–50)
  - FMC SL Fabrica Militar de Cartuchos de San Lorenzo (1950–55).
  - F.M. S.L. Fabrica Militar - San Lorenzo ("Military Factory at San Lorenzo") (1955–61);
  - FLB Fray Luis Beltran ("Friar Luis Beltran") (post 1958-1961).
  - F.M. FLB Fabrica Militar - Fray Luis Beltran ("Military Factory - Friar Luis Beltran") (1961–75)

I.M.P.A. Industria Metalurgica y Plastica Argentina ("Industrial Metallurgy & Plastics - Argentina") - Buenos Aires, Argentina.

=== Resellers ===
There are companies that do not manufacture or assemble cartridges of their own but import or contract them from another manufacturer.
La Porteña ("the young lady from the port town") on business addresses is a nickname for Buenos Aires.

- Armeria Carlos Rasetti (1857–1967) - Buenos Aires, Argentina. Imported and sold firearms wholesale. Had an ammunition factory in Paris, France (Armeria de Paris) from 1906 to the 1930s that repackaged German-made ammo from DWM and other makers.
- Armería La Porteña, Casa Cañedo (Juan Canedo & Cia) (1857–1973) - Buenos Aires, Argentina. Imported and sold firearms and bladed weapons to gentlemen from a storefront. They are known by collectors for their cased pistol sets. Its clientele were among the upper levels of society, the military and the government.
  Was a sales agent for the P.Webley & Sons arms company, the exclusive seller in Argentina for their revolvers and shotguns from 1888 to 1912 and 1946?-1973. Also imported ammunition from Europe under their own label, beginning in the 1890s?.
  Originally it was founded by French gunsmiths Bertonnet and Gaubert to sell their wares. In 1878 it was taken over by merchant Juan Lopez, who began selling cutlery alongside imported firearms. In 1888 it was taken over by Juan Canedo, one of Lopez's clerks, who renamed the store Casa Cañedo. After Cañedo retired or died in 1912, the store was taken over by the local wholesale merchant firm of Gottling & Busch (Alfredo Gottling and ? Busch). They kept the storefront's name as Casa Canedo but prominently added theirs to the packaging and seals. Imported firearms were now marked Armeria ("the Armory") rather than Casa Canedo. Cornelio Paats, Gottling's son-in-law, took over the business in 1946 after Busch's death. He introduced a Hunting and Fishing department to expand their sales, as Argentina now had restrictions on arms imports and there were few native gun brands.

== Australia ==
- BB Bertram Bullet Co. Pty. Ltd. (1986–present) – Seymour, Melbourne, Victoria. Bruce Bertram bought Super Cartridge Co.'s machinery and moved it to Seymour, where he began manufacturing brass cases for handloaders. The "BB" is at 12 o'clock and small kangaroos are positioned counter-clockwise at 3 o'clock and 9 o'clock. Brass is sold in lots of 20-case cartons and can be made to customer's specifications with personalized headstamps.
- ICI-ANZ Imperial Chemical Industries – Australia / New Zealand (1940s–1980s) – Deer Park, Melbourne, Victoria. Manufactured cartridges and shotshells from the 1940s until the late 1970s. They also made brass cases for filling and loading by their parent company in the United Kingdom and produced Australian-gauge shotshells for the local market. The factory now makes commercial explosives under the ORICA brand.
- RBA or RIVERBRAND Riverbrand Ammunition Company, (1945? – early 1980s) – Hendon, South Australia, Australia. Syd Churches, owner of the Taipan Bullet Company, bought out the defunct Small Arms Ammunition Factories No. 3 & 4 at Hendon after the war. Initial production just remanufactured old military-surplus brass cases with new RWS-made non-corrosive Berdan primers. They then mated them with Taipan-manufactured bullets to make cheap .303 Imperial and 7.62mm NATO ammo. "UPDATE 30/11/2020. The above information is totally incorrect. Sid Churches owner operator of Taipan Projectiles Pty Ltd (1946–1980) did not own Riverbrand Ammunition (RBA) at any time. RBA was owned and operated by Ron Holmes. It is true that SOME RBA ammunition was loaded with Taipan Projectiles, including 303 British, 303/270, 303/25 and later 308. ALL Taipan Projectiles supplied to RBA featured a knurled cannellure. No knurled cannelure, not a genuine Taipan Projectile. RBA also used other Projectiles including ICIANZ and CIL, yet claimed the use through advertising as Taipan Projectiles due to that companies high reputation at that time (1950's through to 1970). This continual advertising of RBA ammunition with Taipan Projectiles was a bone of contention with Sid Churches and eventually all supplies of Taipans to RBA ceased in about 1963. A Taipan Projectiles History website has been launched in April 2020. End Update. Early new production (marked "RBA") used Berdan primed brass cases. Full production (marked "RIVERBRAND") used newly manufactured Boxer-primed cases in a variety of service pistol and "wildcat" sporting rifle cartridges, as well as new brass for handloaders. They also made ammo for Sportco in Adelaide under the SPORTCO headstamp. Riverbrand was always a small-scale endeavor, as there was too much competition from Super Cartridge Company (their only domestic manufacturing rival) and foreign ammunition manufacturers.
- SUPER Super Cartridge Co. (? – 1985) – Maribyrnong, Melbourne, Victoria. Manufacturer of cartridges, shotshells, and bullets and brass cases for handloading. They originally sold sporting cartridges made from reloaded Australian-made .303 Imperial brass and sold "wildcat" cartridges made from the base .303 cartridge. (These usually had the original Small Arms Ammunition Factory headstamp on them). They also made proprietary "wildcat" ammunition for the MYRA Sports Store in Broken Hill, New South Wales. They were sued for copyright infringement in the early 1980s by Olin-Winchester for their similar one-piece polymer shotshell design. They were barred from making the shells, gave up manufacturing shotshells altogether, and later went out of business in the mid-1980s.
- TAIPAN Bullets (late 1980s-2017) – Gympie, Wide Bay–Burnett, Queensland. After Churches' death in the late 1970s, RIVERBRAND's bullet-making machinery was sold and moved to facilities in Queensland, where it was set up as TAIPAN Bullets. Owner Malcolm Bone manufactured bullets in small lots for hand loaders. The company's major toolmaker and die-setter died a few years ago. Bone announced in 2017 he was ceasing new production and selling off the remaining stock. UPDATE 30/11/2020. Above information is partly incorrect. Sid Churches owner operator of Taipan Projectiles 1946–1980 DID NOT OWN Riverbrand Ammunition. Sid Churches died in May 1987, not late 1970's as stated above. Taipan Projectiles manufacturing plant was sold to a NSW consortium in 1981 called SAC (Small Arms Company). That company folded in about 1985 and was on sold to a Queensland Operator.

== Austria ==
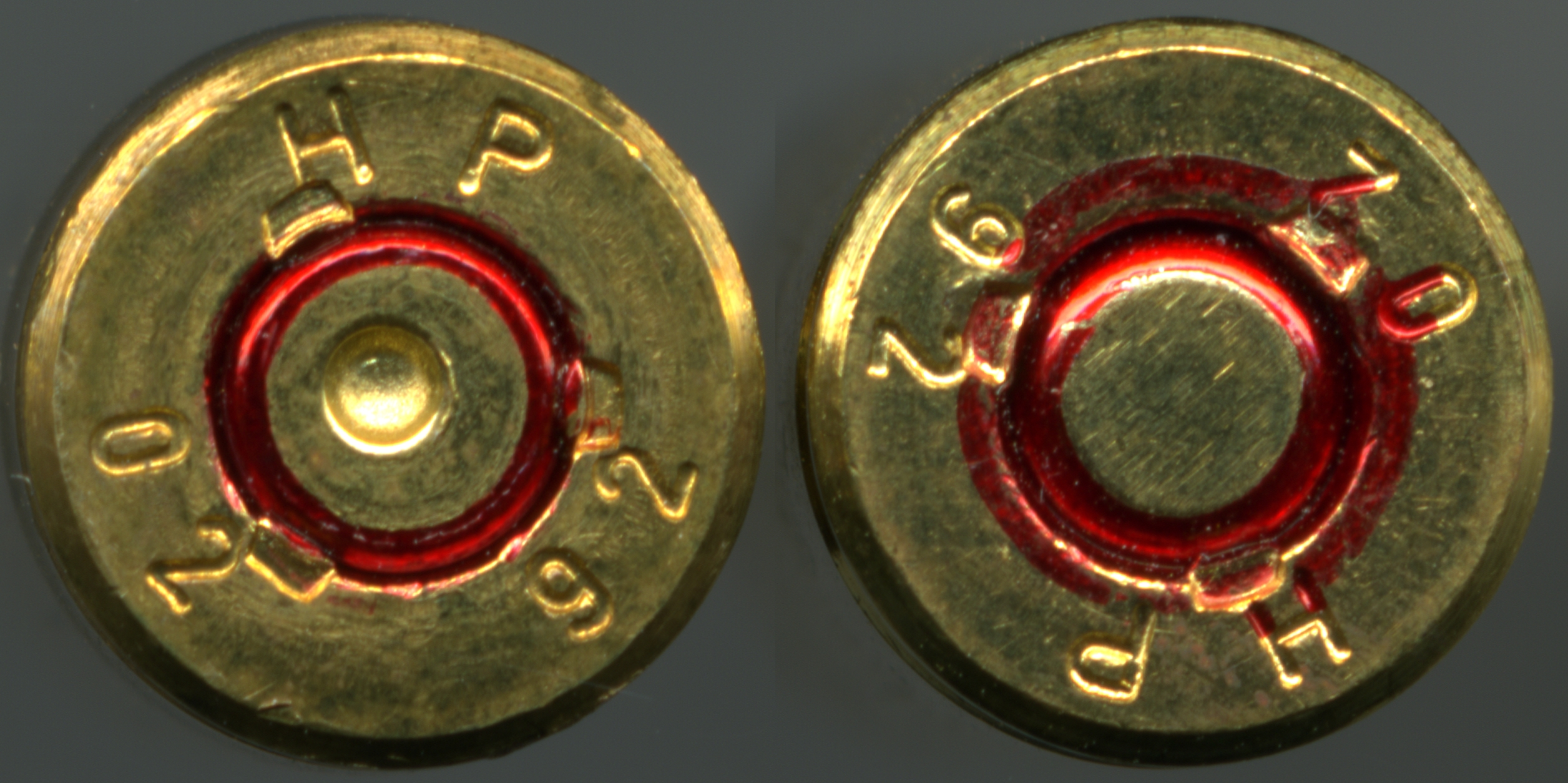
Cartridge base with a headstamp by Hirtenberger

- HP, H or P – Hirtenberger Patronen-, Zündhütchen-und Metallwarenfabrik A.-G., Hirtenberg, Austria

== Bangladesh ==
A common head stamp is BOF (Bangladesh Ordnance Factory). Sometimes a two-digit year and/or a caliber may be included.

== Belgium ==
- Cartridges made by Fabrique Nationale may be marked FN, FNH, FNB, or H.
- Cartridges made from the 1800s to the mid-twentieth century by Anciens Establissements Pieper Hertsal may be marked AEP or A.E.P.
- Cartridges made by Van Bruaene Rik may be narked VBR-B at 6 o’clock with the caliber at 12 o’clock.

== Brazil ==
- CBC Companhia Brasileira de Cartuchos S.A. (1926–Present) – It owns the Magtech Ammunition brand, which is its exported commercial and law-enforcement ammunition division. Currently CBC Group also controls MEN (Metallwerk Elisenhütte Nassau) (2007) and Sellier & Bellot (2009).

== Burkina Faso ==
Cartridges made by Industrial Society Burkina Arms and Ammunition (SIBAM) may be marked SIBAM or CV (Cartoucherie Voltaique (CARVOLT)).

== Canada ==
=== Arsenals ===
- C-I-L or CIL Canadian Industries Ltd. (1955–1976). A corporation formed in 1910 from a merger of five Canadian explosives companies and their assets. It ran the Defence Industries Ltd. munitions plants from 1940 to 1946. It owned the Dominion, Imperial and Canuck commercial ammunition brands. It used the CIL headstamp on its cartridges from 1955(?) until 1976, when IVI bought out its commercial ammunition production.

=== Civilian contractors ===
- RR Co Ross Rifle Co. (1914–1919) – Verdun, Quebec; Canada.

=== Commercial manufacturers ===
- DCCO, Dominion Dominion Cartridge Co. Ltd. (1886–1955) – Brownsburg, Quebec, Canada. A division of Dominion Arsenal that produced ammunition for the civilian market. It was made part of the Canadian Explosives Company (CXC) in 1911, which became Canadian Industries Ltd. (CIL) in 1928. During World War II it made military ammunition for CIL under the DCCO headstamp. It changed its headstamp to Dominion in 1947 and to CIL in 1955, but was still sold under the Dominion brand. It was sold to IVI in 1966.
- Eatons Eaton's Department Store (1924–1950s?) – A line of commercial cartridges made by Dominion Cartridge Co. for the Eaton's Department Store chain.
- F.W.L & Co F.W Lamplough & Co (1903–1917) – Montreal, Quebec. A wholesale hardware and cutlery company (1902-@1936). They assembled their own cartridges from components made by ammo manufacturers but under their own headstamp.
- Gévelot Canada Gévelot of Canada (1961–1973) – Saskatoon, Saskatchewan. The short-lived Canadian branch of the French sporting ammunition firm Gévelot (1823–1997?). They assembled complete cartridges from imported French-made components.
- HSA Hingston Smith Arms Co. Ltd. (1879–1920s?) – Winnipeg. A general store that sold firearms, ammunition, hunting and camping gear, taxidermy supplies, and police equipment.
- Imperial A commercial brand of ammunition manufactured by Canadian Industries Ltd. (CIL); it later used the headstamp CIL-Imperial from 1954 to 1976. It was bought out by IVI Inc. in 1976, restarted production in 1977, and ceased production in 1991(?).

== Colombia ==
INDUMIL Industria Militar [Colombian Military Industry], company owned by the Government of Colombia operate the only authorised manufacturing company that produce weapons and munitions for both the military and civilian markets. Makes 9×19mm NATO [8 gram / 124 grain bullet], 9×19mm Luger [115 grain bullet], 9×19mm Subsonic [158 grain], 9×19mm Factor 132, .223 Remington, 5.56×45mm NATO, .32 Smith&Wesson, .38 Special, and .38 Special Factor 132. They also make several shotgun shells in 12Ga, 16Ga and 20Ga. Pistol & Rifle ammunition uses "IM" as headstamp, the last 2 digits of the year of manufacture and 2 digits for the designation. Revolver and Shotgun shells are stamped as "Indumil" and the calibre.

== China ==
NORINCO (North Industries Corporation) – Beijing, China. Operates several state arsenals that produce weapons and munitions for both the military and civilian markets. Makes the Big Star rimfire and China Sports centerfire ammunition brands. Currently they make 9×18mm Makarov, 9×19mm Parabellum, .45 ACP, .223 Remington [5.56×45mm], 7.62×39mm Soviet, and .308 Winchester [7.62×51mm] ammo.

NORINCO 7.62×39mm Soviet ammunition was banned from importation into the United States in February, 1994. This was due to the fact that the military surplus ammunition couldn't pass the "magnet test". Non-compliant semi-armor-piercing and armor-piercing rounds have steel penetrators or steel cores that will be attracted by a magnet. The NORINCO copper-plated steel-jacketed Full Metal Jacket bullets would be attracted by a magnet – making it hard to distinguish between compliant lead-core and non-compliant steel-cored ammunition.

=== Arsenals ===
Ammunition headstamp has the arsenal number and the last 2 digits of the year of manufacture. The following are arsenals known to produce civilian lead-core ammunition.

- 31 or 031 State Factory 31 – (Commercial ammo is packed in two-tone red-black box with white lettering and the NORINCO and China Sports names in gold lettering.)
- 71 State Factory 71 – (Commercial ammo is packed in plain light green box with black lettering and the NORINCO name and symbol in red lettering on white backing)
- 311 State Factory 311 – (Commercial ammo is packed in plain yellow box with black lettering and the NORINCO name and symbol in red lettering.)
- 351 State Factory 351 – (Commercial ammo is packed in plain gray box with black lettering and the NORINCO name and symbol in red lettering.)

=== Manufacturers ===
- CBCC Commercial ammo is packed in a plain cardboard box stamped with purple ink. Headstamp has the metric designation (e.g., 7.62×39) at 12 o'clock, the "CBCC" at 9 to 6 o'clock, and the two-digit year at 3 o'clock (oriented with the "CBCC" text and facing inward to the center).
- C J Jing-An Light Industries Corporation (NORINCO-Jinan) – Jinan, Shandong province, People's Republic of China. Makes rimfire and centerfire sporting ammunition and shotshells. (Commercial ammo is packed in plain dark green box with black lettering and the NORINCO name and symbol in red lettering on white backing). Headstamp has the C at 10 o'clock and the J at 2 o'clock.
- CN China NORINCO.
- CNIC China Northern Industries Corp.. Headstamp has the metric designation (e.g., 7.62×39) at 12 o'clock and the "CNIC" at 6 o'clock.
- J E NORINCO
- L Y NORINCO Headstamp has the L at 9 o'clock and the Y at 3 o'clock.
- NIC North Industries Corporation.
- NRC NORINCO – Republic of China.
- N S NORINCO Sport Ammunition.

=== Counterfeits ===
The use of counterfeit ammunition is perplexing, since NORINCO already makes ammunition and sells quite a lot of it. Theories abound: it was made for use by Chinese-backed insurgents, it was designed to get in on the surplus ammo market, or it was designed to make users leery of Western-made surplus ammunition and get them to buy new foreign-made ammo.

- LC 52 Chinese copies of American .30 Carbine ammo with forged Lake City (headstamp "LC") markings. The ammunition was copper-washed steel-jacketed bullets with copper-washed steel cases. (This makes it magnetic – so it may fail the BATF magnet test used to detect illegal semi-armor-piercing and armor-piercing steel-core penetrators). Some are found in brass cases, and are readily identifiable after firing, as these cases are still Berdan primed. Unlike the USGI ammo, which has non-corrosive Boxer primers, it has corrosive Berdan primers. The cases have longitudinal scratches along the sides, like they have been reloaded. The bullet has a black sealant at its base and the primer has a clear pinkish-red sealant rather than an opaque red sealant. They come packed in 50-round cartons. Unlike US military ammunition, which have glued seams and an arsenal label printed-on or glued-on the box, the boxes' seams are stapled and are crudely stamped 7.62mmLC in blue ink on the top. It is reported to have high pressures that are unsafe to use in an M1 carbine, especially a vintage one.
- RG 60 Chinese copies of British 7.62mm NATO L2A2 ball ammo with forged Radway Green markings. The lettering on the counterfeit cartridge headstamps are shallow and crude compared to that of Radway Green. The ammunition was copper-washed steel-jacketed bullets with copper-washed steel cases and corrosive primers. It came packed loose in a green-painted 300-round zinc "spam can" with a cloth handle attached to "D-rings" on the sides. It also came packed with knockoff 5-round British Mk.3 chargers marked with forged MTY 60 markings (indicating Mettoy, a former British government contractor); these came packed 5 to a can. The knockoff chargers can be identified by the fact that the tool stamp is in a smaller typeface than the genuine models.

== Czech Republic ==
- S&B, SBP, or Ŏ S&B Ŏ (Sellier & Bellot) – Vlašim, Prague, Czechoslovakia. (1825–Present) Made percussion caps from 1825 and metal cartridges from 1870. Acquired by Companhia Brasileira de Cartuchos (CBC) in 2009.
- LIBRA (Libra a.s.) (1996–2005?) – Jevišovice, Znojmo District, South Moravian Region, Czech Republic. Ammunition company founded by inventor Vlastimil Libra. Manufactured the 9×19mm and 7.65×17mm Snek ("Snail") High-Velocity Armor-Piercing round, 9×19mm +P Extra Sport-AT High-Velocity round (headstamp: LIBRA&AT) and the .17-caliber Libra round. The company went out of business after they were caught in a sting operation in 2004 trying to sell armor-piercing ammunition illegally.

=== Resellers ===
There are companies that do not manufacture or assemble cartridges of their own but import or contract them from another manufacturer.

- TPZ-KOPP (KOPP-TPZ s.r.o.) (1991–2017) – Pavlice, Znojmo District, South Moravian Region, Czech Republic. KOPP was a reseller that sold Russian-made 9×19mm Parabellum and 7.62×39mm ammunition to avoid an embargo. The Tula Cartridge Plant (Тульский патронный завод – ТПЗ / Tul'skiy Patronnyy Zavod – TPZ) made the cartridges. KOPP repacked them in new packaging and exported them for sale. After 2004 they also sold Tula- and Ulyanovsk-made .22 Long Rifle, 9×18mm Makarov, 9×19mm Parabellum, 7.62×51mm NATO (.308 Winchester), 5.45×39mm M74 Soviet, 7.62×39mm M43 Soviet, and 7.62×54mm M91 Russian ammunition that had TCW, TPZ, and ТПЗ headstamps and 1990s production dates.

== Egypt ==
What appears like "TO" is actually the Arabic letters for Haa (ح) and Mim (م), the first letters of the words for "Military Factory". It is an Egyptian Military property mark, much like the broadshead arrowhead used by the British Government. The larger versions of the symbol has the numbers ٧٢ ("27") inset in the circle split by the vertical line. The "TO" is found on the base of shotgun shells, which Military Factory 27 makes for the civilian hunting market.

- ٧٢ مح Military Factory 27 (Shubra Company for Engineering Industries) (1953–present) – Shubra, Cairo, Egypt.

== Germany ==
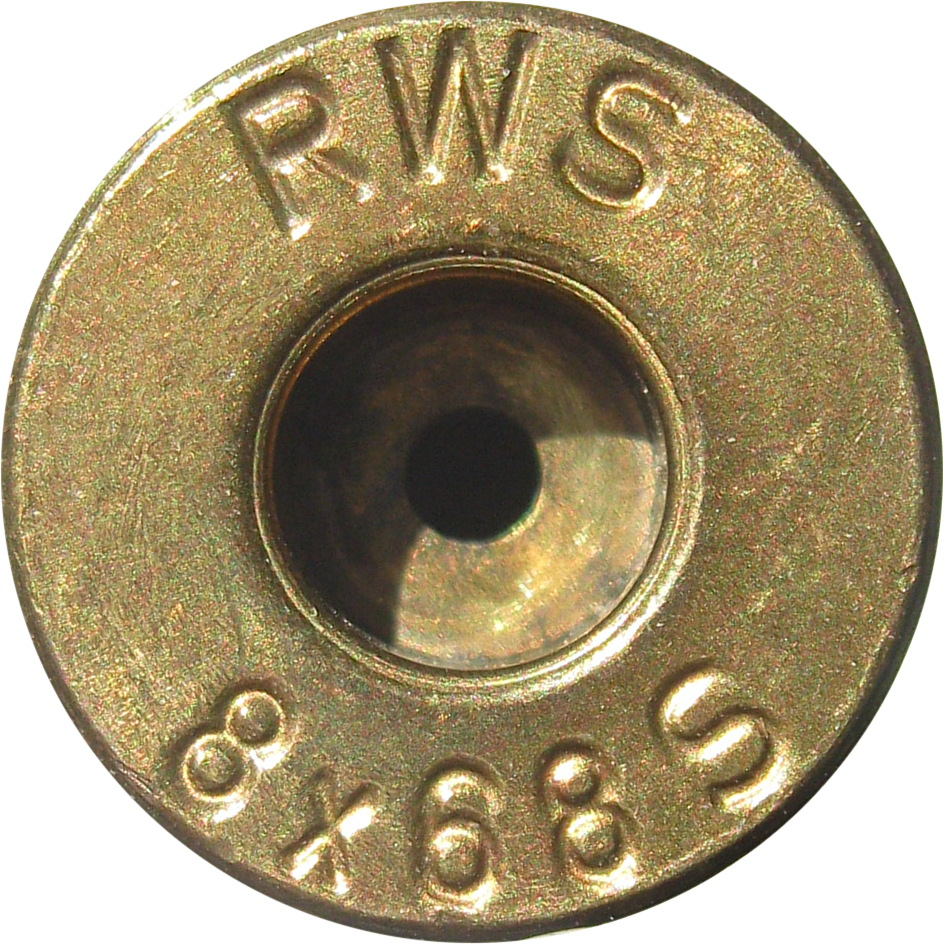
RWS headstamp on an 8×68mm S rifle cartridge

- GECO Gustav Genschow & Co. (1887–1945; 1951–present) – Berlin, Germany. Produces a wide range of pistol and rifle cartridges, shotshells, and air gun pellets. Formerly part of Dynamit-Nobel since 1946, now part of the RUAG Ammotec group. It makes the GECO Aktion Safety (GAS) brand, a type of hollow-core brass alloy safety bullet. GAS was imported to America in the 1980s by entrepreneur Phil Engeldrum as the "Blitz Action Trauma" (BAT) brand.
- ME, MEN Metallwerk Elisenhütte Nassau GmbH (1957–present) – Nassau, Rhein-Lahn-Kreis, Rheinland-Pfalz, Germany. Formed in 1957 to provide ammunition to the West German Bundeswehr. Bought out by vehicle manufacturer Maschinenbau-Actiengesellschaft Nürnberg (MAN) in 1990 and focused on police and military sales in 1996. Bought out by CBC in 2007 and renamed MEN DefenseTec in 2018(?).
- RWS Rheinisch-Westfälischen Sprengstofffabriken. Makes rimfire cartridges, centerfire hunting rifle cartridges, and air gun pellets. Owns the Rottweil shotshell brand.

=== Resellers ===
There are companies that do not manufacture or assemble cartridges of their own but import or contract them from another manufacturer.

- Deurus Handelsgesellschaft ("Deurus Trading Company") – An ammunition wholesaler. They own the GRIEF ("Griffin") brand, which was contracted to MFS of Hungary.
- Transarms (?-present) – Worms-Pfeddersheim, Rheinland-Pfalz, Germany. A firearms dealer and ammunition wholesaler. Their "Target" brand (manufactured in the late 1980s and early 1990s) was contracted out to Fábrica Nacional de Munições (FNM) and came in .223 Remington, .303 British, .308 Winchester, 6.5mm Swedish, and 8x57mm JS.

== Greece ==
- EDP (Olympic Industries S.A.) - Axioupoli, Kilkis, Greece. Very fly-by-night company started by a Mr. Basil Papadopoulos; the headstamp letters E and D are named for his sons Elias and Dimitirus. Used to buy components from other manufacturers like Iran's DIO or the Czech Republic's Sellier & Bellot. Bought old machinery from the Luhansk plant in Ukraine in the 1990s to make their own components; didn't pay the later installments and got sued. From 2005 to 2009 it was contracted to run Fabryka «Suvenir» for the North Macecdonian government, but no ammunition was manufactured.
  - NPA 99 (National Police Agency, Ministry of the Interior – Taiwan) Headstamp used by Olympic Cartridge Company for a 1999 Taiwanese contract for 9mm Parabellum and 5.56mm NATO SS/109 SAP ammo [Green Tip]. Used their own cases made on Ukrainian machinery; they were notoriously out of specification and sometimes wouldn't pass a gauge test. Headstamp is NPA at 10 o'clock followed by the two-digit year of manufacture at 2 o'clock (e.g., NPA 99).

== Italy ==
- Fiocchi Fiocchi Munizioni – Lecco, Italy.
- HB Enrico Barthe & Cie (1883–1889) – Milan, Italy. A company created as a front for the Società Franco Italiana per la fabbricazione delle Munizioni di caccia, da tiro, da guerra, ed affini (SFIM, "Franco-Italian Corporation for the manufacture of hunting, target-shooting, warfare, and related munitions"). SFIM was the Italian sales division of Société Française des Munitions (SFM, "French Association for Munitions"), the munitions division of the French firm Gevelot. It was an Italian-registered firm created for tax purposes. The president of the firm, Henri Barthe, was an SFM employee that used to be owner of Tarbes Freres before merging with SFM in 1883. French by birth and nationality, they recorded his name as Enrico Barthe in the incorporation papers – although being an Italian citizen or of Italian birth were not prerequisites for the tax law loophole.
- LBC, LEON BEAUX, BEAUX Leon Beaux & Cie. (1889–1960s?) – Milan, Italy. A company created as a front for SFIM, the Italian sales division of SFM, the munitions division of the French firm Gevelot. It was an Italian-registered firm created for tax purposes. Leon Beaux, an SFIM salesman, took over from Henri Barthe as president of SFIM in 1889 and the front company was renamed after him. In 1932 the company was renamed Società Italiana Munizioni, Léon Beaux & C., Milano (SIM, "Italian Association for Munitions") but was still owned by Gevelot. It was briefly nationalized by Mussolini's government from July 26, 1940, to October 19, 1943. After the war Gevelot had SFM manufacture the cartridge components in France and had SIM assemble them in Italy.
- PERFECTA Manufactured by Fiocchi Munizioni.

== Mexico ==
- AGUILA Aguila Ammunition, a division of Industrias Tecnos S.A. de C.V. ("Technical Industries") – Cuernavaca, Mexico (1961–present). Originally set up with the technical assistance of its original partner Remington, Aguila eventually became independent. Centurion Ordnance of Helotes, Texas, USA is the North American distributor.
- CI Cascade Cartridges International S.A. de C.V. – San Luis Potosí, Mexico. Formerly the Mexican branch of American manufacturer CCI (Cascade Cartridges Incorporated). Now a partner with Industrias Tecnos.
- VF Industrias Tecnos S.A. de C.V. ("Technical Industries") – Cuernavaca, Mexico. Made for Navy Arms Co. of Ridgefield, New Jersey from 1983 to the 1990s. The VF stands for Val Forgett Jr. – the owner of Navy Arms Co.
- Z Sovereign Ammunition, a division of Industrias Tecnos S.A. de C.V. ("Technical Industries") – Cuernavaca, Mexico (1961–present). Owns the Tigercat rimfire ammo brand. The "Z" is sometimes inset in a "D" shape (for Deportivo – Spanish > "Sporting"). Southern Gun Distributors of Opa-Locka, Florida is the North American distributor.

== Romania ==
- SADU UM Sadu (?-2014) – Bumbești-Jiu, Gorj, Romania. Usually found on contract civilian hunting and sporting ammunition like Red Army Standard. The metric caliber is at 12 o'clock, the contractor (SADU) is at 8 o'clock, and the 2-digit year of production is at 4 o'clock.
- R SD UM Sadu (2015–present) – Bumbești-Jiu, Gorj, Romania. The new headstamp for all ammunition produced by UM Sadu, replacing the plethora of headstamps in use. The contractor (R SD > "Romania, Sadu") is at 10 o'clock, the 2-digit year is at 2 o'clock, and the metric caliber is at 6 o'clock.

== Slovakia ==
- ZVS ZVS IMPEX A.S. – Dubnica nad Váhom, Trenčín, Trenciansky kraj, Slovakia. ZVS IMPEX is a division of the ZVS Group that was created in 1998. It manufactures 9×19mm Parabellum ammunition and shotgun shells. Century International Arms of Delray Beach, Florida is the North American distributor. Since 2013 it also makes the ZVS P20 9mm handgun and ZVS P21 9mm target handgun. As of 2015 it was made part of MSM Group Ltd.

== South Africa ==
- AMT AmmoTech (Ammutechse) (1991?–1999?) – Wierda Park, Centurion, Gauteng, Republic of South Africa. Small ammo-manufacturing company. Packed their ammo in blue clamshell boxes. Bought out by New Generation Ammunition in the late '90s, who made their facility their new headquarters.
- M M Musgrave Manufacturers and Distributors (Pty) Ltd. (1933–1996) – Bloemfontein, Mangaung Municipality, Free State, Republic of South Africa. Musgrave Rifles was a gunsmithing firm started by Ben Musgrave that made safari rifles. It was bought out by Armscor in 1971. It went out of business in 1996; Denel/PMP bought its machinery and plans and sent them to Vektor Arms, a division of Lyttelton Engineering Works, which began manufacturing Musgrave guns. It made its own match-grade hunting ammunition, particularly a line of "wildcat" safari cartridges designed by Musgrave and based on the .303 British cartridge. The ammunition plant was used to make .303 British, 7.9mm Mauser and 9×19mm Parabellum military ammunition during World War 2 from 1940 to 1945. Pretoria Metal Pressing made cases for them without a headstamp that were sold in foreign markets under the Musgrave match ammunition brand during the embargo.
- mus Musgrave Ammunition (1976?–1978?) – Ammunition made for Musgrave by Hirtenberger Patronenfabrik. Headstamp had "mus" at 12 o'clock and the caliber at 6 o'clock. A letter (ranging from F to Z) is at 9 o'clock and a single digit number (ranging from 6 to 8) at 3 o'clock; these might be load types or a Lot / year of production code.
- NGA New Generation Ammunition (1994–2016?) – Wierda Park, Centurion, Gauteng, Republic of South Africa. Sold both newly manufactured self-defense and police pistol ammunition and captured Com-Bloc military ammunition. Comes in hard plastic clamshell ammo tray boxes; tan for new manufacture and red for Com-Bloc surplus. The company went out of business not long after the 2009 assassination of Ivan Monsieur, the company's founder and CEO. Its reloaded 'Range Ready' and repacked ComBloc surplus product lines were of poor reliability, which affected its brand loyalty.
- RDM Rheinmetall Denel Munition (Pty) Ltd. – a division of the Rheinmetall Group (2008–present) – Boksburg, Republic of South Africa. A division of Rheinmetall composed of Denel's Somchem (1971–2007), Norschem (1896–2007), Boksburg (1996–2007), and Swartclip (1948–2007) chemical companies.
- SWARTKLIP (a division of Denel Corporation) (1948–2007) – Swartklip, Limpopo, Republic of South Africa. A chemical and pyrotechnics company (formerly Ronden Manufacturing Co. from 1948 to 1971) that was bought out by Denel in 1971. It manufactured .22 caliber rimfire and shotgun sporting ammunition as a side business. Imported into the United States by Armscorp USA Inc. of Baltimore, Maryland.

== Sweden ==
- NORMA AB Norma Projektilfabrik.

== Turkey ==
- BPS (Balıkesir Explosives Industry and Trade, Inc.) [2014–Present] - Balıkesir, Turkey. Founded in 2014 by Mehmet Akif Yavaşca and Müşteba Yavaşca. Partnered in 2015 with Sarsilmaz Ammunition Inc. of the Sarsilmaz Group. They have produced shotgun shells since 2016 and 9×19mm Parabellum ammo since 2019.
- GA Guardian Ammunition – Afton, Virginia, USA. A brand of ZQI (Zenith Quest International), the North American distributors for MKE's civilian-market ammunition. They sell 9×19mm Parabellum, 5.56×45mm NATO and 7.62×51mm NATO ball ammo.
- TRN Turan Ammo (1997-present) - Üzümlü, Turkey. They sell 9x19mm Parabellum, 5.56×45mm NATO (.223 Remington) and 7.62×51mm NATO (.308 Winchester) ammo. Headstamp has TRN at 12 o'clock, 2-digit year at 8 o'clock and metric caliber at 4 o'clock.

== United Kingdom ==
- ICI Imperial Chemical Industries Ltd. (1926–1977) - Millbank, London, England. Ammunition production was handled by a subsidiary called Imperial Metal Industries, which was spun off as its own company in 1977.
- KYNOCH Kynoch Factories, a division of Imperial Chemical Industries Ltd. – Witton, Birmingham, England.
- WWG W. W. Greener – Birmingham, England.

== United States ==
- NR on a headstamp stands for "Non-Reloadable". It indicates that the cartridge cases are made of aluminum and are unsafe to reload.
- NT on a headstamp stands for "Non-Toxic". It indicates that the primer compound is Diazodinitrophenol (DDNP) rather than Lead styphnate.

=== Manufacturers ===
- ♦ Western Cartridge Company – East Alton, Illinois. Used on the base of rimfire cartridges.
- *⁀* (5-point stars or 6-point asterisks at 10-o'clock and 2-o'clock connected by a semi-circular arc) Starline Brass (1976–present) – Sedalia, Missouri. Manufactures brass casings for discontinued and "wildcat" pistol cartridges in 250, 500, and 1,000 case lots for handloaders and small-batch ammo manufacturers.
- A-MERC American Ammunition (1983–2014) – Miami, Florida. Manufactured brass casings for handloaders and small-batch cartridges. Went out of business in 2014 due to internet backlash concerning a drop in product quality.
- ARMSCOR USA (1985–2009), A USA (2009-Present), A P, ACP Armscor USA (a division of Rock Island Armory) – Pahrump, Nevada. Headstamp was changed from ARMSCOR USA to A USA in 2009. A P and ACP stands for Armscor Precision, one of their ammo brands.
- ATL ARMS Atlanta Arms - Covington, Georgia. It makes ammunition under their Classic Match, Elite, Elite Defense, and Select brands.
- CCI Cascade Cartridges Inc., a division of Omark Industries (1951–present) – Lewiston, Idaho. Founded by Richard Speer and Arvid Nelson to manufacture cartridge cases while his brother Vernon Speer (founder of Speer Bullets) provided the bullets. In 1967, the founders were bought out by Omark Industries.
- F, FC, FCC Federal Cartridge Corporation – Anoka, Minnesota
- FB USA First Breach, Inc. - Hagerstown, Maryland, USA. Manufactures match-grade ammunition.
- H Winchester Repeating Arms Company – New Haven, Connecticut:
- *I* – CCI/ATK's Independence ammunition brand. It uses reloadable cartridge cases with non-corrosive Boxer primers.
- MIDWAY (Midway Arms) (1980-1998?) - Columbia, Missouri. Sold complete cartridges from 1980, beginning with 8mm Nambu and began selling cartridge components like cases from 1986.
- P, PCCo or PETERS Peters Cartridge Company – Kings Mills, Ohio.
- P Phoenix Metallic Cartridge Company - South Coventry, Connecticut (1872–1891; 1891–1898). Joseph Merwin and brothers Milan and Henry Hulbert (owners of the Merwin & Hurlbert firearms factory) took over the Henry W. Mason Company and renamed it to the Phoenix Metallic Cartridge Company. It was successful until the death of Joseph Merwin in 1879; the Hulbert brothers had to settle with Merwin's estate and did not buy out his heirs completely until 1891. It was then bought out by Marcellus Hartley, president of the Union Metallic Cartridge Company, and Thomas Bennett and Arthur Hooper, president and vice president (respectively) of the Winchester Repeating Arms Company and renamed the American Metallic Cartridge Company (1891–1898). The two joint owners used the facility to manufacture shotgun shells using its unique copyrighted "X.L." design utilizing a paper sabot. After the patent expired in 1896, the South Coventry factory was closed in 1898.
- R-P Remington-Peters – Lonoke, Arkansas (1970–present). Lonoke facility only produced centerfire ammo from 1970; took over rimfire production from Bridgeport in 1989.
- R--P Remington Peters – Bridgeport, Connecticut (1960–1989). Bridgeport facility only produced rimfire ammo from 1970, then finally closed down in 1989.
- RA Remington Arms – Bridgeport, Connecticut
- REM-UMC Remington-Union Metallic Cartridge – Bridgeport, Connecticut (1911–1960). Renamed Remington-Peters in 1960.
- S.A. Co. Savage Arms Company - Utica, New York. Savage made their own ammunition from 1900 to 1927 due to being boycotted by the Ammunition Manufacturers' Association. Savage later contracted out to US Cartridge Company to make ammunition under their headstamp from 1928 to 1934.
- SCI Specialty Cartridge Inc. - Covington, Georgia (2015-2025?). A munitions and components manufacturing company that deals civilian ammunition through their Atlanta Arms division. It also provides high-quality ammunition to government or law enforcement agencies.
- SSA Silver State Armory – Pahrump, Nevada. A match-grade ammunition manufacturer. They make their own cases, primers, and propellants but contracted the bullets out to Barnes, Nosler, and Sierra.
- SUPER-VEL (1963–1974) – Shelbyville, Indiana. A company started by Lee Jurras to manufacture high-pressure and wildcat cartridges. It became popular with police departments and began getting government contracts. However, their businesses' weakness was that they relied on other manufacturers for their cartridge cases. When their suppliers cut them off, they had trouble finding new sources and contracts had to be delayed or canceled. The facility closed in 1974 and its equipment and property sold for back taxes in 1975.
- U Remington Arms – Bridgeport, Connecticut:
- US United States Cartridge Company (1867–1926) – Lowell, Massachusetts.
- WCC, Winchester Military (Western Cartridge Company) -East Alton, Illinois. The number next to WCC is the year of manufacture.
- W, WIN, or WINCHESTER Winchester Repeating Arms Co. – Bridgeport Connecticut.
- WCC or WESTERN Western Cartridge Company – East Alton, Illinois
- W-W Winchester-Western Company (1965–present) – East Alton, Illinois
- WRA Co. or WRA Winchester Repeating Arms Company – New Haven, Connecticut
- WIN, or WINCHESTER Winchester (a division of Olin Corp.) – East Alton, Illinois
- WISE J. B. Wise Inc – Watertown, New York.
- ZERO Zero Ammunition Company – Cullman, Alabama.

Ammunition Manufacturers' Association (Winchester Repeating Arms Company, US Cartridge Company, Union Metallic Cartridge, and Phoenix Metallic Cartridge Company) [1900-1907]. The 'Big Four' formed a group that cut out any arms companies they saw as a potential threat (like Savage and Western). They refused to make ammunition for them or even sell them the components. It fell apart in 1907 due to internal squabbling. The side-effect is that their methods forced their spurned customers to become rivals who made their own components and assembled their own cartridges. Union Metallic Cartridge got bought out by Remington Arms in 1912, US Cartridge Company was bought out by National Lead Company (who owned Winchester) in 1918, followed by Winchester being bought out by Olin Industries (who owned Western Cartridge) in 1931.

=== Resellers ===
There are companies that do not manufacture or assemble cartridges of their own but import or contract them from another manufacturer.

- Colt Manufacturing Co. (2013–present) – Hartford, Connecticut. Colt got into the ammunition importation business in 2013. They import .380 ACP, 9mm Luger, .40 S&W, .45 ACP, .223 Remington, .308 Winchester, and .30-06 Springfield. Headstamp has "COLT" at 12 o'clock and the caliber from 9 o'clock to 6 o'clock. Initial imports were nickel-plated steel-cased ammunition by Barnaul; they had their monogram mark on the headstamp at 3 o'clock. They were replaced by American vendors in 2014. Black Hills Ammunition makes rifle ammunition using Sierra Bullet Company bullets. GBW Cartridge of Venice, Florida makes brass-cased pistol ammunition.
- Hanson's Cartridge Company (a division of Hansen & Hansen Arms and Antiques) (1970s–1995?) – Southport, Connecticut. An auction house that developed a sideline in importing cartridges from Yugoslavia (Prvi Partizan Uzice (PPU) and Igman Konjic). With the beginning of the Yugoslavian Civil War (1991–1999) they had to find new suppliers. They briefly imported ammunition from Israel before closing down in the late 1990s.
- Herter's – Sidney, Nebraska. Cabela's reseller brand.
- Liberty Ammunition – Bradenton, Florida. An ammunition reseller who owns the Civil Defense and Civil Trainer pistol ammunition and Animal Instinct rifle ammunition brands. They make lead-free bullets with non-toxic primers. Headstamps indicate they contract with German firms like DAG and RWS.
- RED ARMY Red Army Standard – Delray Beach, Florida. Century International Arms' ammunition reseller brand. They contract with Russian, Ukrainian (Lugansk Cartridge Works) and Eastern European (Igman Konjic) manufacturers.
- TulAmmo USA – Round Rock, Texas. Resells Russian ammunition from the Tula and Ulyanovsk plants.
- White Stores Inc. (1960–1982;1982–1985) – Wichita Falls, Texas. A sporting goods (White Sportster) and auto-parts (White Auto Store) store chain that sold small-caliber ammunition and shotgun shells under their Nimrod brand. The ammunition was made and packaged by C.I.L. It was bought out by Canadian Tires in 1982, but was sold off to new investors in 1985.

== Yugoslavia ==
- PPU##, PP-YU Prvi Partizanki zavod ad Užice ("First Partisan" Ammunition Plant at Užice) – Užice, Yugoslavia (now Serbia). Headstamps on Communist-era commercial ammunition had the caliber at 12 o'clock and the contractor code (PPU or PP-YU) at 6 o'clock. PPU was followed by the 2-digit production year (e.g., PPU63).

== See also ==
=== Military Headstamps ===
Military cartridge headstamps do not usually have the caliber and cartridge name on it. The headstamp may have a 2- or 3-symbol letter, number, or alphanumeric code indicating the place of manufacture. This is usually followed by two digits indicating the last two digits of the year of manufacture; they may have additional digits or a letter indicating the month or yearly quarter of manufacture. The packaging usually has the manufacturer code, 2-digit year, and a lot number on it so bad or suspect batches can be removed.
