= Explosive train =

Sequence of events that results in the detonation of explosives

A triggering sequence, also called an explosive train or a firing train, is a sequence of events that culminates in the detonation of explosives. For safety reasons, most widely used high explosives are difficult to detonate. A primary explosive of higher sensitivity is used to trigger a uniform and predictable detonation of the main body of the explosive. Although the primary explosive itself is generally a more sensitive and expensive compound, it is only used in small quantities and in relatively safely packaged forms. By design there are low explosives and high explosives made such that the low explosives are highly sensitive (i.e. their Figure of Insensitivity is low) and high explosives are comparatively insensitive. This not only affords inherent safety to the usage of explosives during handling and transport, but also necessitates an explosive triggering sequence or explosive train. The explosive triggering sequence or the explosive train essentially consists of an 'initiator', an 'intermediary' and the 'high explosive'.

For example, a match will not cause plastic explosive to explode, but it will light a fuse coupled with a blasting cap which will detonate a primary explosive that will shock a secondary high explosive and cause it to detonate. In this way, even very insensitive explosives may be used; the primary detonates a "booster" charge that then detonates the main charge. Triggering sequences are used in the mining industry for the detonation of ANFO and other cheap, bulk, and insensitive explosives that cannot be fired by only a blasting cap or similar item.

== Low explosive train ==
An example of a low-explosive train is a rifle cartridge, which consists of

1. a primer consisting of a small amount of primary high explosive which initiates the explosive train
2. an igniter which is initiated by the primer and creates a flame that ignites the propellant
3. a propellant consisting of a secondary low explosive that emits a large amount of gas as it deflagrates.

== High explosive train ==
High-explosives trains can be either two-step (e.g., detonator, [containing primary explosive] and dynamite / other sensitive secondary) or three-step configuration (e.g., initiator, [detonator, compound cap or NPED] booster of intermediate explosive, and main charge of insensitive secondary explosive).

=== Primary components ===
A high explosive train includes three primary high explosive components which are used to initiate explosives:

1. Fuse or fuze
2. Primer
3. Detonator

Detonators are conventionally made from tetryl and fulminates, but can be made of other initiating explosive materials.

=== Secondary components ===
In an explosive train there are two secondary high explosive components:

1. Boosters
2. Bursting charges, also known as the main charge

Examples of explosives used in bursting charges are

- TNT
- Composition B
- Ammonal
- Semtex
- RDX
- HMX
- ETN
- PETN
- C-4
- Other suitable Binary explosives

=== Tertiary components ===
1. main charge

Examples of main charges are

- TNT
- Composition B
- Pentolite
- Baratol
- Amatol
- PLX
- HMX
- ETN
- PETN
- Other suitable binary explosives

In some cases, the main charge is so insensitive that using typical primary materials becomes impractical due to large amount required. Thus, an explosive booster is used to deliver a sufficient shockwave to successfully initiate the main charge, as so full detonation occurs.

The most significant tertiary material in widespread general usage is ANFO, an explosive binary made from Ammonium nitrate and Fuel oil.
