= Detonator =

Small explosive device used to trigger a larger explosion

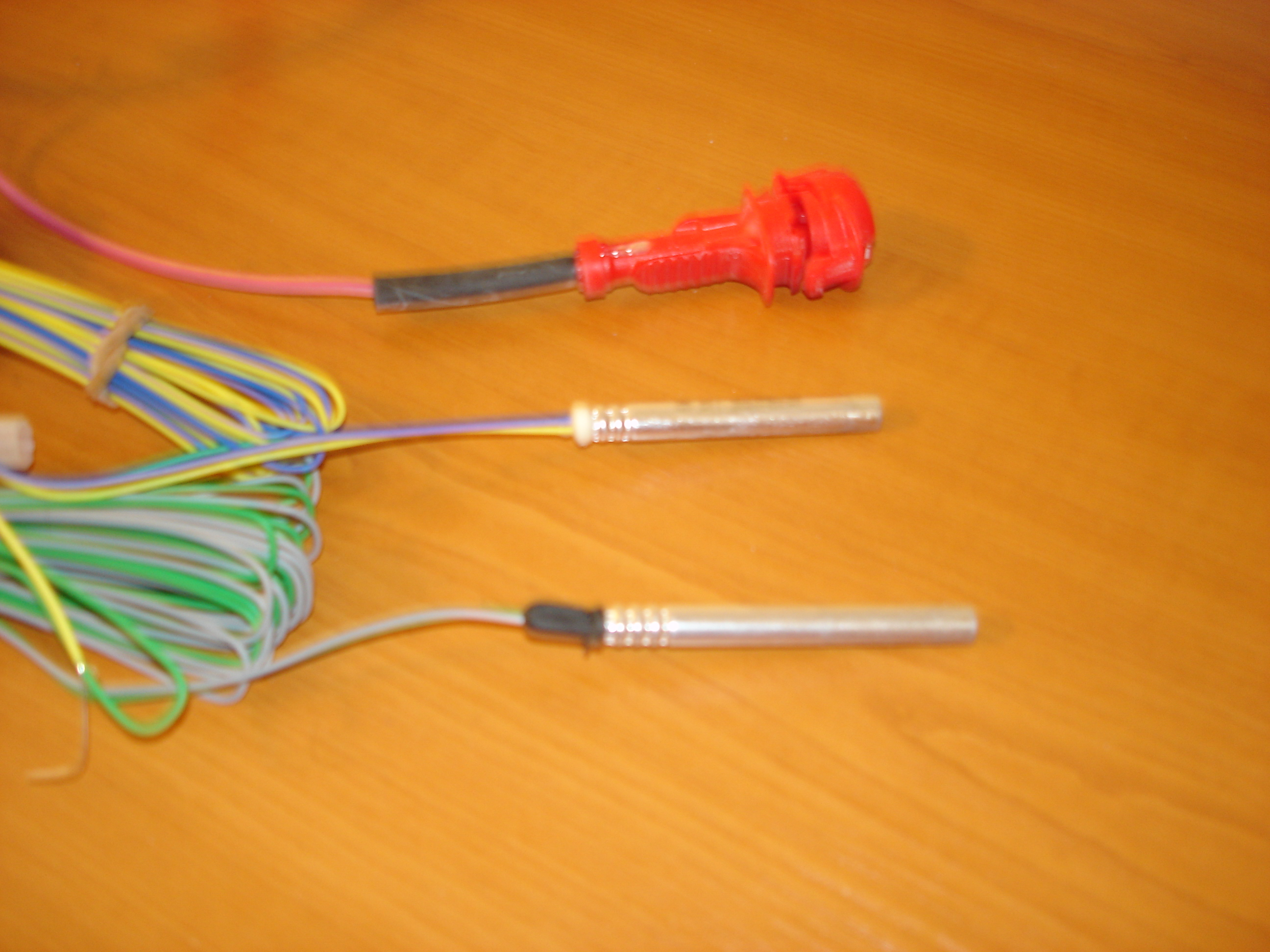
Top: small nonel detonator with 2 ms delay for chaining nonel tubes; middle: class B SPD detonator; bottom: class C SPD detonator

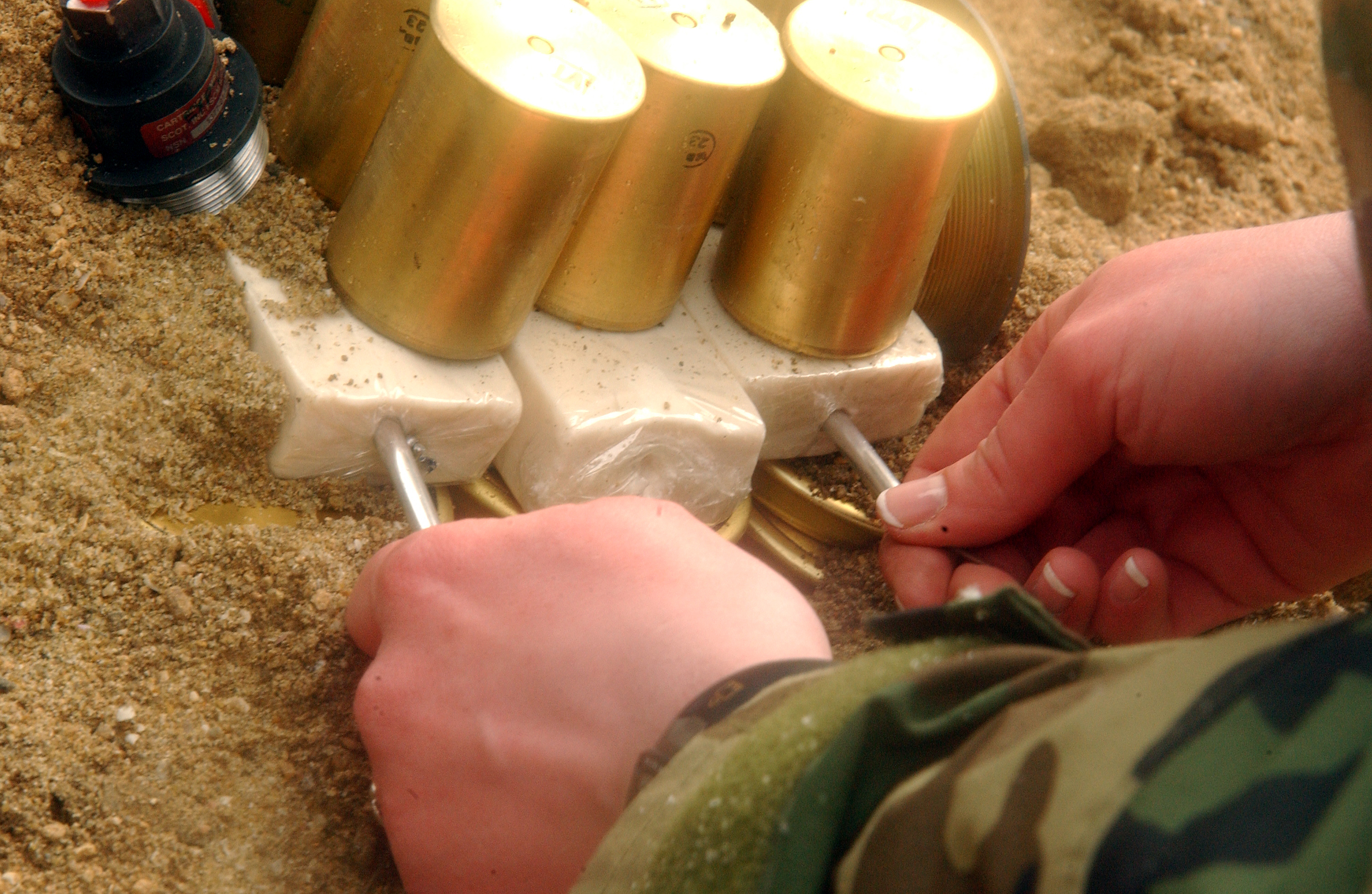
Inserting detonators into blocks of C-4 explosive

A detonator or blasting cap is a small explosive device or small quantity of explosive, which can be combined with a fuse, used for detonating a larger charge of high explosive. Detonators come in a variety of types, depending on how they are initiated (chemically, mechanically, or electrically) and details of their inner working, which often involve several stages. Types of detonators include non-electric and electric. Non-electric detonators are typically stab or pyrotechnic while electric are typically "hot wire" (low voltage), exploding bridge wire (high voltage) or explosive foil (very high voltage).

The original electric detonators invented in 1875 independently by Julius Smith and Perry Gardiner used mercury fulminate as the primary explosive. Around the turn of the century performance was enhanced in the Smith-Gardiner blasting cap by the addition of 10–20% potassium chlorate. This compound was superseded by others: lead azide, lead styphnate, some aluminium, or other materials such as DDNP to reduce the amount of lead emitted into the atmosphere by mining and quarrying operations. They also often use a small amount of TNT or tetryl in military detonators and PETN in commercial detonators.

== History ==
The first blasting cap or detonator was demonstrated in 1745 when British physician and apothecary William Watson showed that the electric spark of a friction machine could ignite black powder, by way of igniting a flammable substance mixed in with the black powder.

In 1750, Benjamin Franklin in Philadelphia made a commercial blasting cap consisting of a paper tube full of black powder, with wires leading in both sides and wadding sealing up the ends. The two wires came close but did not touch, so a large electric spark discharge between the two wires would fire the cap.

In 1832, a hot wire detonator was produced by American chemist Robert Hare, although attempts along similar lines had earlier been attempted by the Italians Volta and Cavallo. Hare constructed his blasting cap by passing a multistrand wire through a charge of gunpowder inside a tin tube; he had cut all but one fine strand of the multistrand wire so that the fine strand would serve as the hot bridgewire. When a strong current from a large battery (which he called a "deflagrator" or "calorimotor") was passed through the fine strand, it became incandescent and ignited the charge of gunpowder.

In 1863, Alfred Nobel realized that although nitroglycerin could not be detonated by a fuse, it could be detonated by the explosion of a small charge of gunpowder, which in turn was ignited by a fuse. Within a year, he was adding mercury fulminate to the gunpowder charges of his detonators, and by 1867 he was using small copper capsules of mercury fulminate, triggered by a fuse, to detonate the nitroglycerin.

In 1868, Henry Julius Smith of Boston introduced a cap that combined a spark gap ignitor and mercury fulminate, the first electric cap able to detonate dynamite.

In 1875, Smith—and then in 1887, Perry G. Gardner of North Adams, Massachusetts—developed electric detonators that combined a hot wire detonator with mercury fulminate explosive. These were the first generally modern type blasting caps. Modern caps use different explosives and separate primary and secondary explosive charges, but are generally very similar to the Gardner and Smith caps.

Smith also invented the first satisfactory portable power supply for igniting blasting caps: a high-voltage magneto that was driven by a rack and pinion, which in turn was driven by a T-handle that was pushed downwards.

Electric match caps were developed in the early 1900s in Germany, and spread to the US in the 1950s when ICI International purchased the Atlas Powder Company, these match caps have become the predominant world standard cap type.

== Purpose ==
The need for detonators such as blasting caps came from the development of safer secondary and tertiary explosives . Secondary and tertiary explosives are typically initiated by an explosives train starting with the detonator. For safety, detonators and the main explosive device are typically only joined just before use.

== Design ==
A detonator is usually a multi stage device, with three parts:

1. at first, the initiation method (fire, electricity, etc.) must provide enough energy (as heat or mechanical shock) to activate
2. an easy-to-ignite primary explosive, which in turn detonates
3. a small amount of a more powerful secondary explosive, directly in contact with the primary, called the "base" or "output" explosive, able to carry out the detonation through the casing of the detonator to the main explosive device to activate it.

Explosives commonly used as the primary in detonators include lead azide, lead styphnate, tetryl, and DDNP. Early blasting caps also used silver fulminate, but it has been replaced with cheaper and safer primary explosives. Silver azide is still used sometimes, but very rarely due to its high price.

It is possible to construct a Non Primary Explosive Detonator (NPED) in which the primary explosive is replaced by a flammable but non-explosive mixture that propagates a shock wave along a tube into the secondary explosive. NPEDs are harder to accidentally trigger by shock and can avoid the use of lead.

As secondary "base" or "output" explosive, TNT or tetryl are typically found in military detonators and PETN in commercial detonators.

While detonators make explosive handling safer, they are hazardous to handle since, despite their small size, they contain enough explosive to injure people; untrained personnel might not recognize them as explosives or wrongly deem them not dangerous due to their appearance and handle them without the required care.

== Types ==
Ordinary detonators usually take the form of ignition-based explosives. While they are mainly used in commercial operations, ordinary detonators are still used in military operations. This form of detonator is most commonly initiated using a safety fuse, and used in non time-critical detonations e.g. conventional munitions disposal. Well known detonators are lead azide [Pb(N_{3})_{2}], silver azide [AgN_{3}] and mercury fulminate [Hg(ONC)_{2}].

There are three categories of electrical detonators: instantaneous electrical detonators (IED), short period delay detonators (SPD) and long period delay detonators (LPD). SPDs are measured in milliseconds and LPDs are measured in seconds. In situations where nanosecond accuracy is required, specifically in the implosion charges in nuclear weapons, exploding-bridgewire detonators are employed. The initial shock wave is created by vaporizing a length of a thin wire by an electric discharge. A new development is a slapper detonator, which uses thin plates accelerated by an electrically exploded wire or foil to deliver the initial shock. It is in use in some modern weapons systems. A variant of this concept is used in mining operations, when the foil is exploded by a laser pulse delivered to the foil by optical fiber.

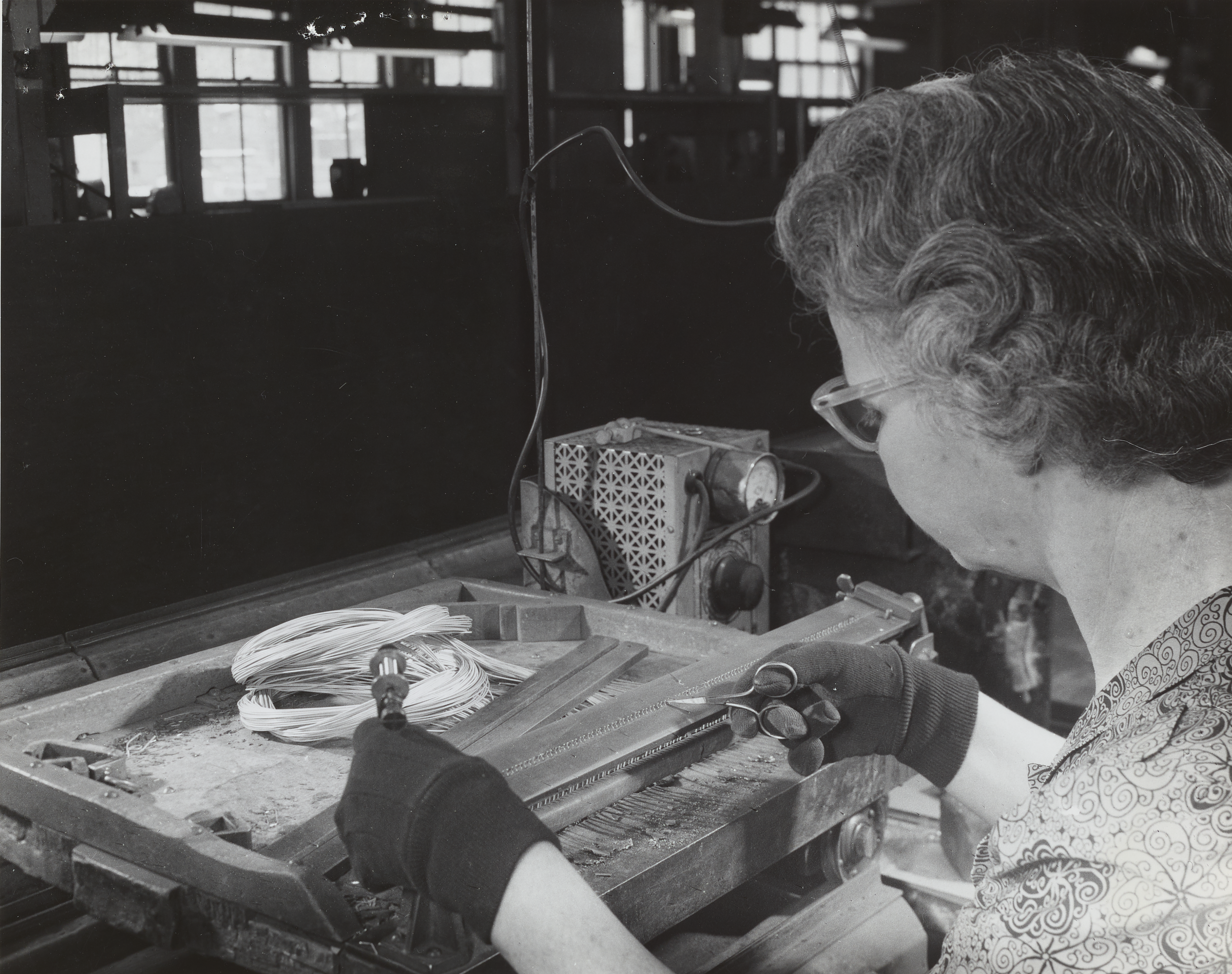
Trimming platinum wires for use in blasting caps, 1955

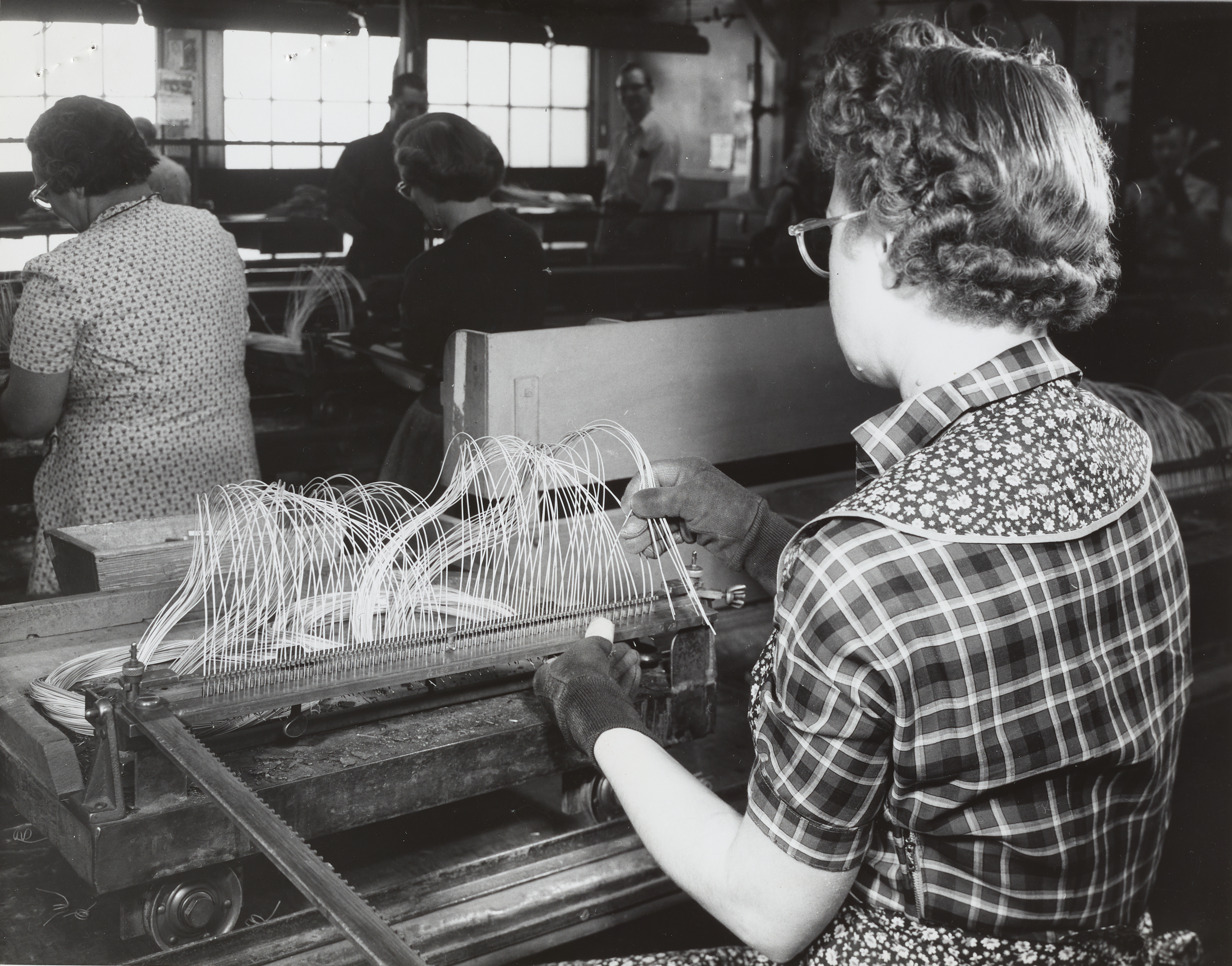
Production of blasting caps, Hercules Powder Company, 1955

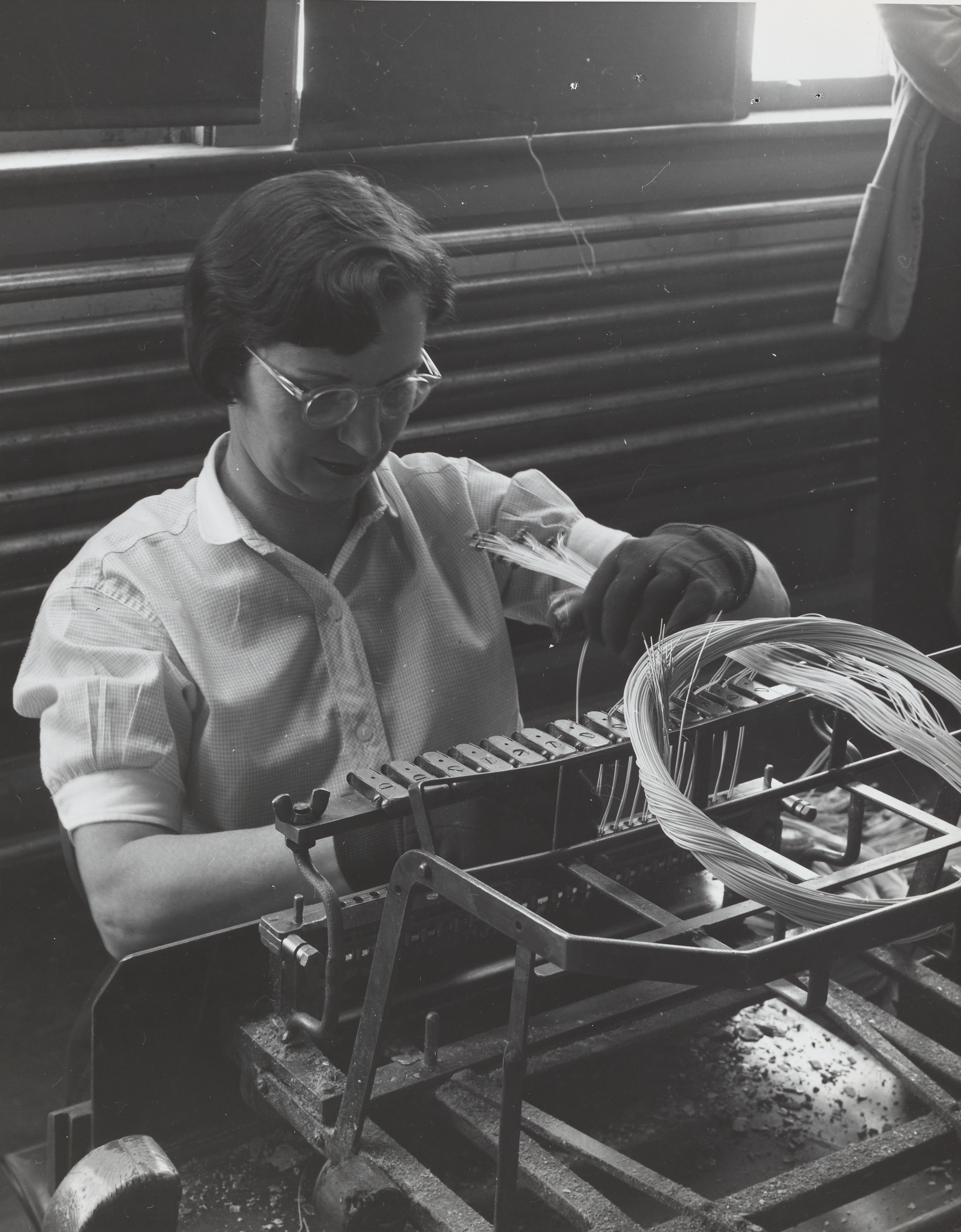
Inserting plug and bridge wire into electric blasting caps, 1955

A non-electric detonator is a shock tube detonator designed to initiate explosions, generally for the purpose of demolition of buildings and for use in the blasting of rock in mines and quarries. Instead of electric wires, a hollow plastic tube delivers the firing impulse to the detonator, making it immune to most of the hazards associated with stray electric current. It consists of a small diameter, three-layer plastic tube coated on the innermost wall with a reactive explosive compound, which, when ignited, propagates a low energy signal, similar to a dust explosion. The reaction travels at approximately 6,500 ft/s (2,000 m/s) along the length of the tubing with minimal disturbance outside of the tube. Non-electric detonators were invented by the Swedish company Nitro Nobel in the 1960s and 1970s, and launched to the demolitions market in 1973.

In civil mining, electronic detonators have a better precision for delays. Electronic detonators are designed to provide the precise control necessary to produce accurate and consistent blasting results in a variety of blasting applications in the mining, quarrying, and construction industries. Electronic detonators may be programmed in millisecond or sub-millisecond increments using a dedicated programming device.

Wireless electronic detonators are beginning to be available in the civil mining market. Encrypted radio signals are used to communicate the blast signal to each detonator at the correct time. While currently expensive, wireless detonators can enable new mining techniques as multiple blasts can be loaded at once and fired in sequence without putting humans in harm's way.

A number 8 test blasting cap is one containing 2 grams of a mixture of 80 percent mercury fulminate and 20 percent potassium chlorate, or a blasting cap of equivalent strength. An equivalent strength cap comprises 0.40-0.45 grams of PETN base charge pressed in an aluminum shell with bottom thickness not to exceed to 0.03 of an inch (0.762 mm), to a specific gravity of not less than 1.4 g/cc, and primed with standard weights of primer depending on the manufacturer.

== Blasting caps ==
Cutaway diagram of various types of blasting caps and detonators

The oldest and simplest type of cap, fuse caps are a metal cylinder, closed at one end. From the open end inwards, there is first an empty space into which a pyrotechnic fuse is inserted and crimped, then a pyrotechnic ignition mix, a primary explosive, and then the main detonating explosive charge. The primary hazard of pyrotechnic blasting caps is that for proper usage, the fuse must be inserted and then crimped into place by crushing the base of the cap around the fuse. If the tool used to crimp the cap is used too close to the explosives, the primary explosive compound can detonate during crimping. A common hazardous practice is crimping caps with one's teeth; an accidental detonation can cause serious injury to the mouth. Fuse type blasting caps are still in active use today. They are the safest type to use around certain types of electromagnetic interference, and they have a built in time delay as the fuse burns down.

Solid pack electric blasting caps use a thin bridgewire in direct contact (hence solid pack) with a primary explosive, which is heated by electric current and causes the detonation of the primary explosive. That primary explosive then detonates a larger charge of secondary explosive. Some solid pack fuses incorporate a small pyrotechnic delay element, up to a few hundred milliseconds, before the cap fires.

Match type blasting caps use an electric match (insulating sheet with electrodes on both sides, a thin bridgewire soldered across the sides, all dipped in ignition and output mixes) to initiate the primary explosive, rather than direct contact between the bridgewire and the primary explosive. The match can be manufactured separately from the rest of the cap and only assembled at the end of the process. Match type caps are now the most common type found worldwide.

The exploding-bridgewire detonator was invented in the 1940s as part of the Manhattan Project to develop nuclear weapons. The design goal was to produce a detonator which functioned very rapidly and predictably. Both Match and Solid Pack type electric caps take a few milliseconds to fire, as the bridgewire heats up and heats the explosive to the point of detonation. Exploding bridgewire or EBW detonators use a higher voltage electric charge and a very thin bridgewire, .04 inch long, .0016 inch diameter, (1 mm long, 0.04 mm diameter). Instead of heating up the explosive, the EBW detonator wire is heated so quickly by the high firing current that the wire actually vaporizes and explodes due to electric resistance heating. That electrically-driven explosion causes the low-density initiating explosive (usually PETN) to detonate, which in turn detonates a higher density secondary explosive (typically RDX or HMX) in many EBW designs. In addition to firing very quickly when properly initiated, EBW detonators are much safer than blasting caps from stray static electricity and other electric current. Enough current will melt the bridgewire, but it cannot detonate the initiator explosive without the full high-voltage high-current charge passing through the bridgewire. EBW detonators are used in many civilian applications where radio signals, static electricity, or other electrical hazards might cause accidents with conventional electric detonators.

Exploding foil initiators (EFI), also known as Slapper detonators are an improvement on EBW detonators. Slappers, instead of directly using the exploding foil to detonate the initiator explosive, use the electrical vaporization of the foil to drive a small circle of insulating material such as PET film or kapton down a circular hole in an additional disc of insulating material. At the far end of that hole is a pellet of high-density secondary explosive. Slapper detonators omit the low-density initiating explosive used in EBW designs and they require much greater energy density than EBW detonators to function, making them inherently safer.

Laser initiation of explosives, propellants or pyrotechnics has been attempted in three different ways, (1) direct interaction with the HE or Direct Optical Initiation (DOI); (2) rapid heating of a thin film in contact with a HE; and (3) ablating a thin metal foil to produce a high velocity flyer plate that impacts the HE (laser flyer).

== See also ==
- Exploding-bridgewire detonator – Detonator fired by electric current
- Explosive booster – Sensitive explosive charge
- TM 31-210 Improvised Munitions Handbook – United States Army manual
- Triggering sequence – Sequence of events that results in the detonation of explosives
