= Nonel =

Shock tube detonator

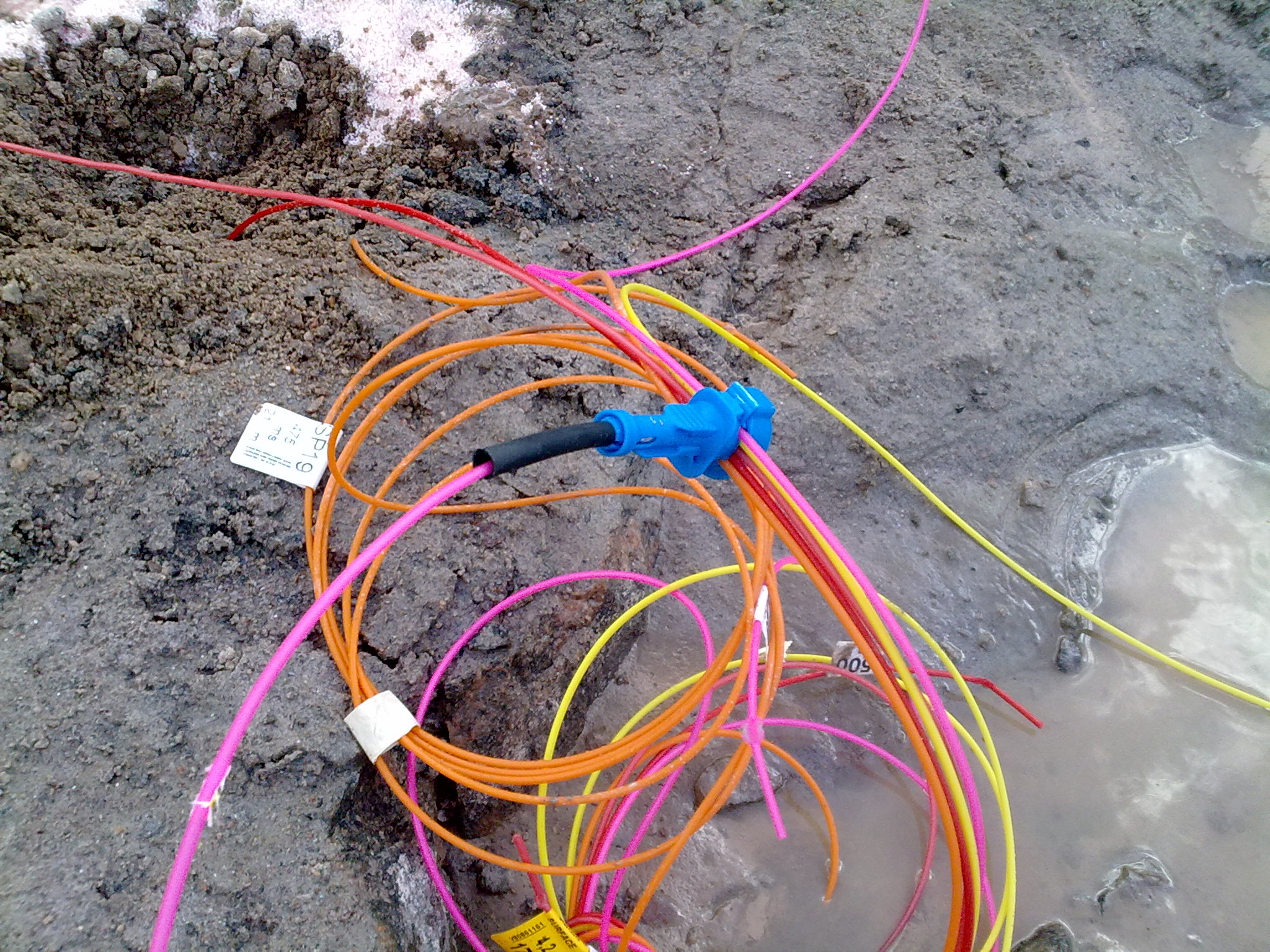
Nonel shock tubes (pink, red, orange, yellow) with Orica surface delay connector (blue) in use.

Nonel is a shock tube detonator designed to initiate explosions, generally for the purpose of demolition of buildings and for use in the blasting of rock in mines and quarries. Nonel is a contraction of "non electric". Instead of electric wires, a hollow plastic tube delivers the firing impulse to the detonator, making it immune to most of the hazards associated with stray electric current.

It consists of a small diameter, three-layer plastic tube coated on the innermost wall with a reactive explosive compound, which, when ignited, propagates a low energy signal, similar to a dust explosion. The reaction travels at approximately 2,000 m/s (6,500 ft/s) along the length of the tubing with minimal disturbance outside of the tube.

Nonel was invented by the Swedish company Nitro Nobel in the 1960s and 1970s, under the leadership of Per-Anders Persson, and launched to the demolitions market in 1973. (Nitro Nobel became a part of Dyno Nobel after being sold to Norwegian Dyno Industrier AS in 1986.)
