= Shock tube detonator =

Non-electric explosive fuze or initiator

A shock tube detonator is a non-electric explosive fuze or initiator in the form of a small-diameter hollow plastic tubing used to transport an initiating signal to an explosive by means of a shock wave (also known as a percussive wave) traveling the length of the tube. Shock tube conveys a detonation signal to a detonator. It is a hollow extruded tube with a thin layer of energetic material on its inner diameter. Once initiated, the shock tube transfers a signal to a detonating output charge.

It was invented by Per Anders Persson of Nitro Nobel AB, patented, and sold under the registered trademark Nonel by the company starting in 1973. It contains a small quantity of high explosive and is considered safer and more reliable than detonating cord containing the same quantity of explosive. Another early product contained an enclosed combusting, non-detonating fiber.

The most common product is 3 mm outer diameter and 1 mm inner diameter, with a thin dusting of HMX/aluminium explosive powder on the tubing's inner surface. This powder detonates down the tube at a speed greater than 2,000 m/s (6,500 ft/s) but does not burst the tube. Being non-electrical and non-metallic, shock tubes are less sensitive to static electricity and radio frequency energy. They have thus replaced many uses of electric detonators and are considered safer to handle and store than detonating cord. A version containing an explosive gas mixture has the additional advantage of being entirely inert until the tubing is charged with the gas.

One manufacturer estimates that over 2 billion feet (610,000 km) of shock tube are used each year worldwide in commercial blasting, military demolition, theatrical special effects, automobile airbags, aircraft ejection seats, IED initiation, and professional fireworks. Shock tube is available with an optional patented in-line initiator consisting of a threaded adapter and a pre-installed percussion primer, providing convenient and reliable initiation.

== See also ==
- Detonating cord – another tubular explosive cord product with much more explosive and direct explosive effects and ability to directly initiate other explosive charges
