= Tetrytol =

Tetrytol is a high explosive, comprising a mixture of tetryl and TNT. Typically, the proportion of ingredients (by weight) is 65%, 70%, 75% or 80% tetryl to 35%, 30%, 25% or 20% TNT. Tetryl and TNT do form a eutectic with a setting point of 67.5 °C, which consists of 55% tetryl and 45% TNT. Hence, cast tetrytol charges consist of solidified suspensions of crystalline tetryl in the solid tetryl-TNT-eutectic. Tetrytol is more sensitive than TNT and less sensitive than tetryl to impact. The detonation velocity of unconfined cast cylindrical charges (1 inch diameter) of tetrytol is between 7290 and 7410 m/s with an average of 7350 m/s for tetrytol 75/25 and 7340 m/s for tetrytol 65/35. For comparison, cylindrical charges of cast pure TNT of similar dimensions are reported to detonate with a velocity of between 6680 and 6990 m/s.

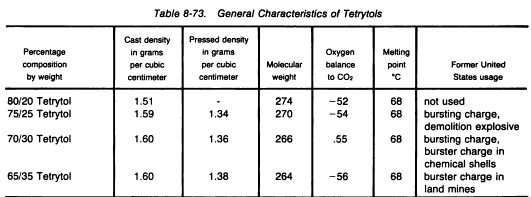
Characteristics of Tetrytols

Applications of tetrytol are usually military in nature e.g. burster tubes for chemical weapons (e.g. nerve agent shells), blocks of demolition explosives and cast shaped charges.

Dry tetrytol is compatible with copper, brass, aluminum, magnesium, stainless steel, mild steel coated with acid proof paint and mild steel plated with copper, cadmium, zinc or nickel. Magnesium-aluminum alloys are slightly affected by dry tetrytol. Wet tetrytol is compatible with stainless steel and mild steel coated with acid proof black paint. Copper, brass, aluminum, magnesium, magnesium-aluminum alloy, mild steel and mild steel plated with cadmium, copper, zinc or nickel are slightly affected by wet tetrytol.

When stored below 65 °C (149 °F) Tetrytol does not change stability, acid content, sensitivity or brisance. However, temperatures at 65 °C or above will allow the formation of an oily extrudate and distortion of blocks. Although tetryl undergoes partial decomposition on melting, the melting of tetrytol does not have the same effect. Even when Tetrytol is melted and solidified numerous times it causes no change in freezing point, sensitivity to impact or 100 °C vacuum stability test value.

Production and use of Tetrytol has been discontinued by the U.S. due to problems relating to exudation and low stability at elevated storage temperatures.
