= Tetryl =

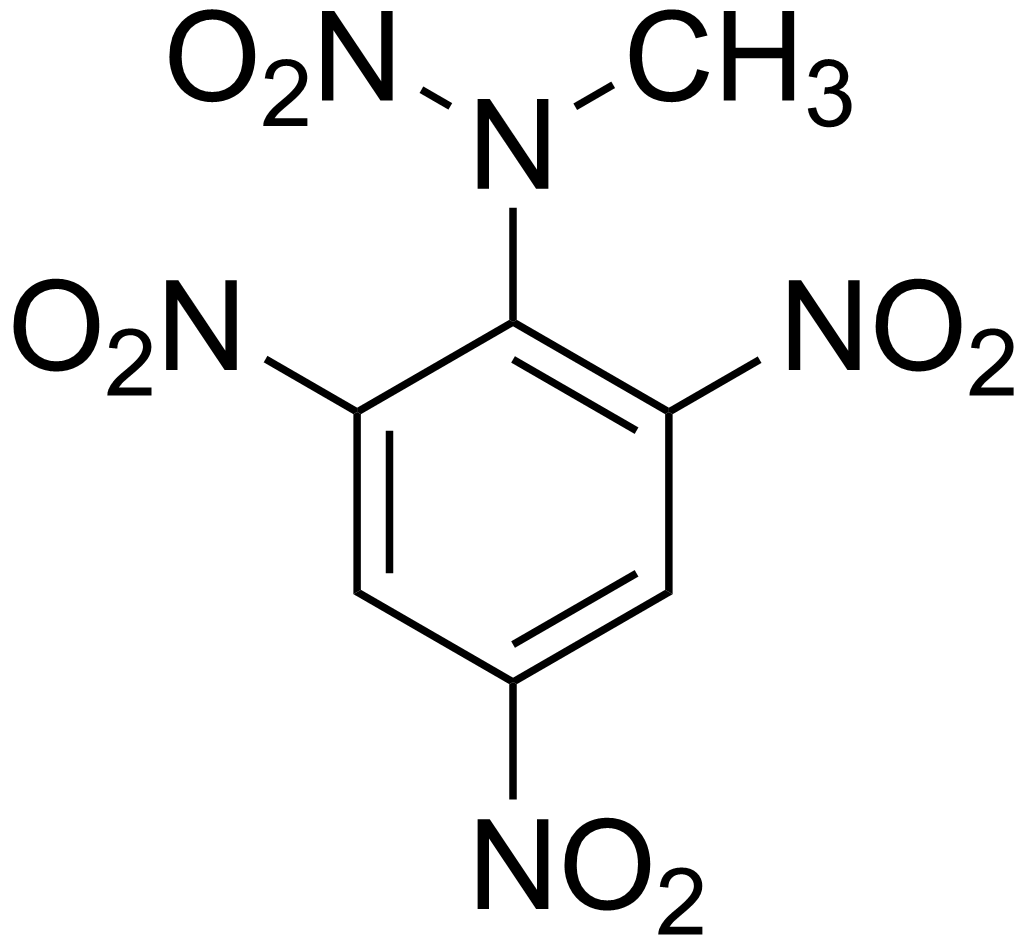

Names
- Preferred IUPAC name Methyl(2,4,6-trinitrophenyl)nitramide
- Other names: Nitramine (incorrect); Tetralite; Tetril; N-Methyl-N,2,4,6-tetranitroaniline; N-Methyl-N,2,4,6-tetranitrophenyl-1-amine

Identifiers
CAS Number	479-45-8
3D model (JSmol)	Interactive image
ChEBI	CHEBI:28950
ChemSpider	9770
ECHA InfoCard	100.006.848
PubChem CID	10178
RTECS number	BY6300000
UNII	GJ18911991
UN number	0208
CompTox Dashboard (EPA)	DTXSID7047770
- InChI: InChI=1S/C7H5N5O8/c1-8(12(19)20)7-5(10(15)16)2-4(9(13)14)3-6(7)11(17)18/h2-3H,1H3 Key: AGUIVNYEYSCPNI-UHFFFAOYSA-N; InChI=1/C7H5N5O8/c1-8(12(19)20)7-5(10(15)16)2-4(9(13)14)3-6(7)11(17)18/h2-3H,1H3 Key: AGUIVNYEYSCPNI-UHFFFAOYAF
- SMILES: CN(c1c(cc(cc1[N+](=O)[O-])[N+](=O)[O-])[N+](=O)[O-])[N+](=O)[O-]

Properties
Chemical formula	C_{7}H_{5}N_{5}O_{8}
Molar mass	287.144 g·mol^{−1}
Appearance	Yellow crystalline solid
Odor	Odorless
Density	1.73 g/cm^{3}
Melting point	129.5 °C (265.1 °F; 402.6 K)
Boiling point	187 °C (369 °F; 460 K) decomposes
Solubility in water	Virtually insoluble
Vapor pressure	<1 mmHg (20°C)

Explosive data
Shock sensitivity	Sensitive
Friction sensitivity	Sensitive
Detonation velocity	7,570 m/s (24,836 f/s)
RE factor	1.25

Hazards
- Lethal dose or concentration (LD, LC)
LD_{Lo} (lowest published)	5000 mg/kg (dog, subcutaneous)
- NIOSH (US health exposure limits)
PEL (Permissible)	TWA 1.5 mg/m^{3} [skin]
REL (Recommended)	TWA 1.5 mg/m^{3} [skin]
IDLH (Immediate danger)	750 mg/m^{3}
- Except where otherwise noted, data are given for materials in their standard state (at 25 °C [77 °F], 100 kPa). verify (what is ?) Infobox references

2,4,6-Trinitrophenylmethylnitramine or tetryl (C_{7}H_{5}N_{5}O_{8}) is an explosive compound used to make detonators and explosive booster charges.

Tetryl is a nitramine booster explosive, though its use has been largely superseded by RDX. Tetryl is a sensitive secondary high explosive used as a booster, a small charge placed next to the detonator in order to propagate detonation into the main explosive charge.

== Chemical properties ==
Tetryl is a yellow crystalline solid powder material, practically insoluble in water but soluble in acetone, benzene and other solvents. When tetryl is heated, it first melts, then decomposes and explodes. It burns readily and is more easily detonated than ammonium picrate or TNT, being about as sensitive as picric acid. It is detonated by friction, shock, or spark. It remains stable at all temperatures which may be encountered in storage. It is generally used in the form of pressed pellets, and has been approved as the standard bursting charge for small-caliber projectiles, since it gives much better fragmentation than TNT. It has an explosive velocity of 23,600–23,900 feet per second (7,200–7,300 m/s). Tetryl is the basis for the service tetryl blasting caps necessary for positive detonation of TNT. A mixture of mercury fulminate and potassium chlorate is included in the cap to ensure detonation of tetryl.

== Environmental effect ==
The most toxic ordnance compounds—‌tetryl and 1,3,5-trinitrobenzene—‌are also the most degradable. Therefore, these chemicals are expected to be short-lived in nature, and environmental impacts would not be expected in areas that are not currently subject to chronic inputs of these chemicals. Tetryl decomposes rapidly in methanol/water solutions, as well as with heat. All aqueous samples expected to contain tetryl should be diluted with acetonitrile prior to filtration and acidified to pH < 3. All samples expected to contain tetryl should not be exposed to temperatures above room temperature. In addition, degradation products of tetryl appear as a shoulder on the 2,4,6-TNT peak. Peak heights rather than peak areas should be used when tetryl is present in concentrations that are significant relative to the concentration of 2,4,6-TNT.

== History and synthesis ==
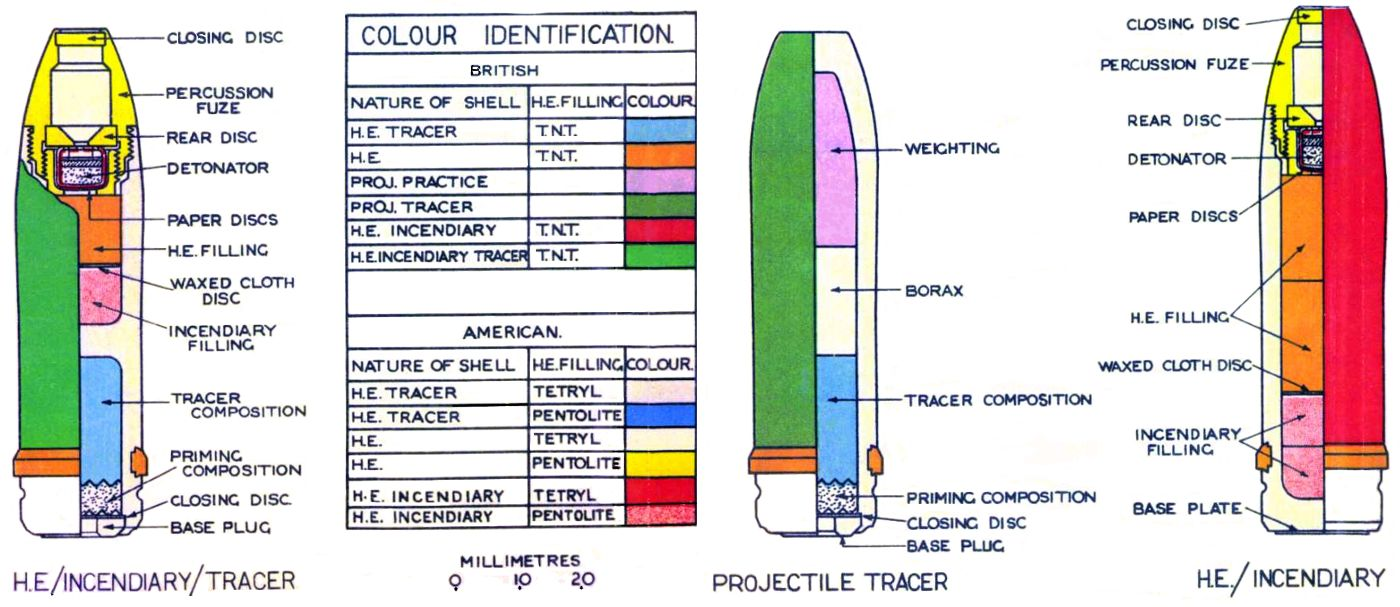
Cross-sectional view of Oerlikon 20 mm cannon shells (dating from circa 1945) showing color code for tetryl filling

Tetryl was used mainly during World Wars I and II and later conflicts. Tetryl is usually used on its own, though can sometimes be found in compositions such as tetrytol. Tetryl is no longer manufactured or used in the United States, but can still be found in legacy munitions such as the M14 anti-personnel landmine.

Dutch chemist Karel Hendrik Mertens originally synthesized the compound as a part of his doctoral dissertation published in 1877 by slowly mixing dimethylaniline with concentrated nitric acid in the presence of sulfuric acid, and it's still a viable lab technique. However, in the 1930s a more economical route was commercialized, where methylamine produced by the Smoleński method (developed after WWI) reacts with dinitrochlorobenzene to make dinitromethylaniline which is then easily nitrated without byproducts.

== Health concerns ==
Although tetryl is among the most toxic explosive compounds, it is very short-lived, especially if in fact detonated. This combined with the fact that the health impacts of this compound are largely unstudied, not much is known about any health problems that this compound may cause.

Epidemiological data shows that tetryl has most effect on the skin, acting as a strong irritant. Symptoms of skin sensitization such as dermatitis, itch, erythema, etc. may occur. Tetryl can also affect mucous membranes, the upper respiratory tract, and possibly the liver.

== See also ==
- Hexanitrobenzene
- Trinitrotoluene
- RE factor
