= Pavlice (Znojmo District) =

- Municipality
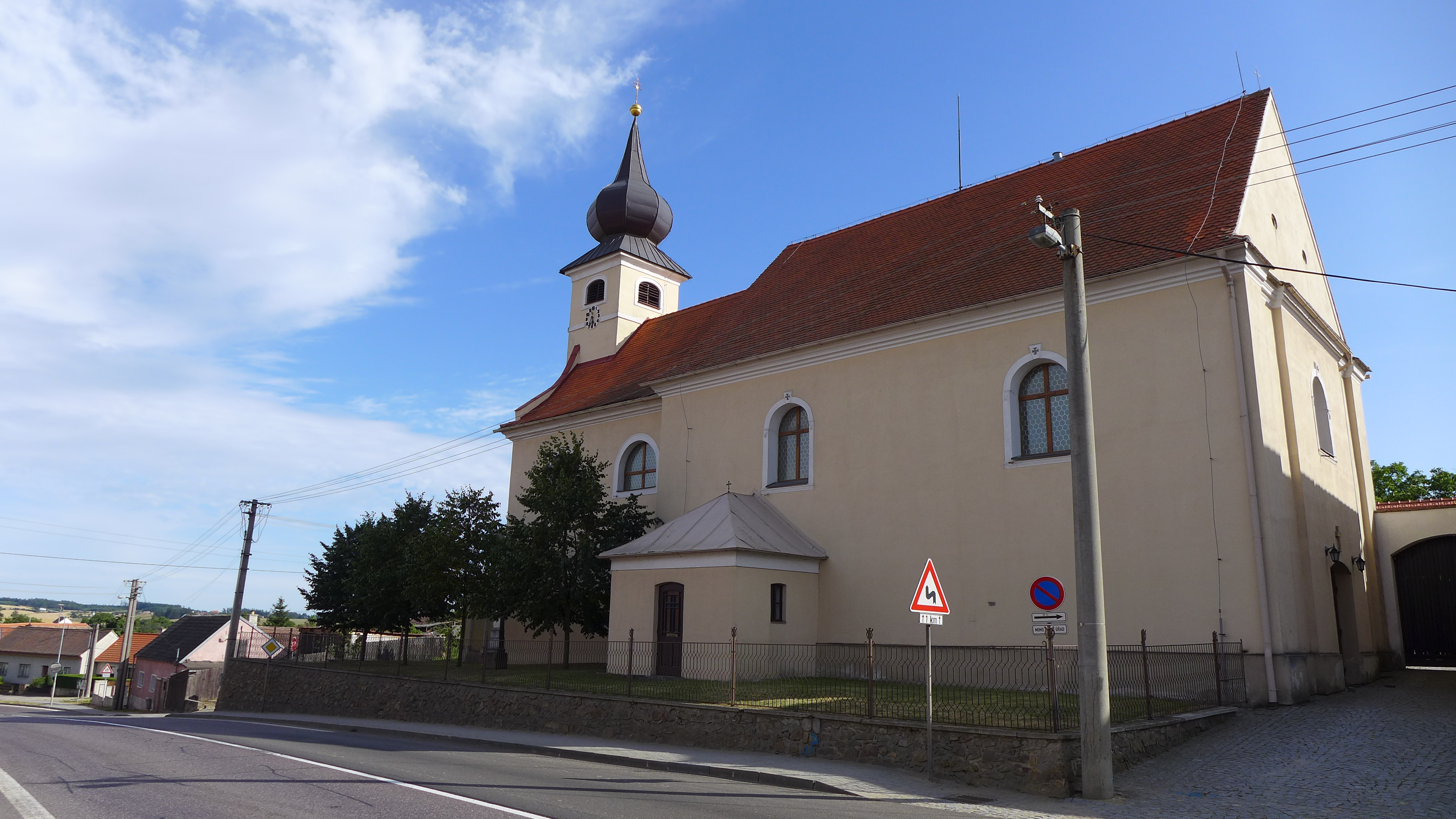
- Church of Saints Philip and James

- Flag Coat of arms

- Location in the Czech Republic
- Coordinates: 48°58′17″N 15°53′56″E
- Country: Czech Republic
- Region: South Moravian
- District: Znojmo
- First mentioned: 1252

Area
  - Total: 14.05 km^{2} (5.42 sq mi)
- Elevation: 402 m (1,319 ft)

Population (2026-01-01)
  - Total: 494
  - Density: 35.2/km^{2} (91.1/sq mi)
- Time zone: UTC+1 (CET)
  - Summer (DST): UTC+2 (CEST)
- Postal code: 671 56
- Website: www.pavlice.cz

Pavlice is a municipality and village in Znojmo District in the South Moravian Region of the Czech Republic. It has about 500 inhabitants.

Pavlice lies approximately 16 kilometres (10 mi) north-west of Znojmo, 58 km (36 mi) south-west of Brno, and 165 km (103 mi) south-east of Prague.

== Demographics ==
Historical population
| Year | Pop. | ±% |
|---|---|---|
| 1869 | 578 | — |
| 1880 | 670 | +15.9% |
| 1890 | 667 | −0.4% |
| 1900 | 667 | +0.0% |
| 1910 | 743 | +11.4% |
| 1921 | 713 | −4.0% |
| 1930 | 674 | −5.5% |
| 1950 | 620 | −8.0% |
| 1961 | 669 | +7.9% |
| 1970 | 584 | −12.7% |
| 1980 | 495 | −15.2% |
| 1991 | 452 | −8.7% |
| 2001 | 478 | +5.8% |
| 2011 | 462 | −3.3% |
| 2021 | 476 | +3.0% |
Source: Censuses
