= Diazodinitrophenol =

Diazonium structure
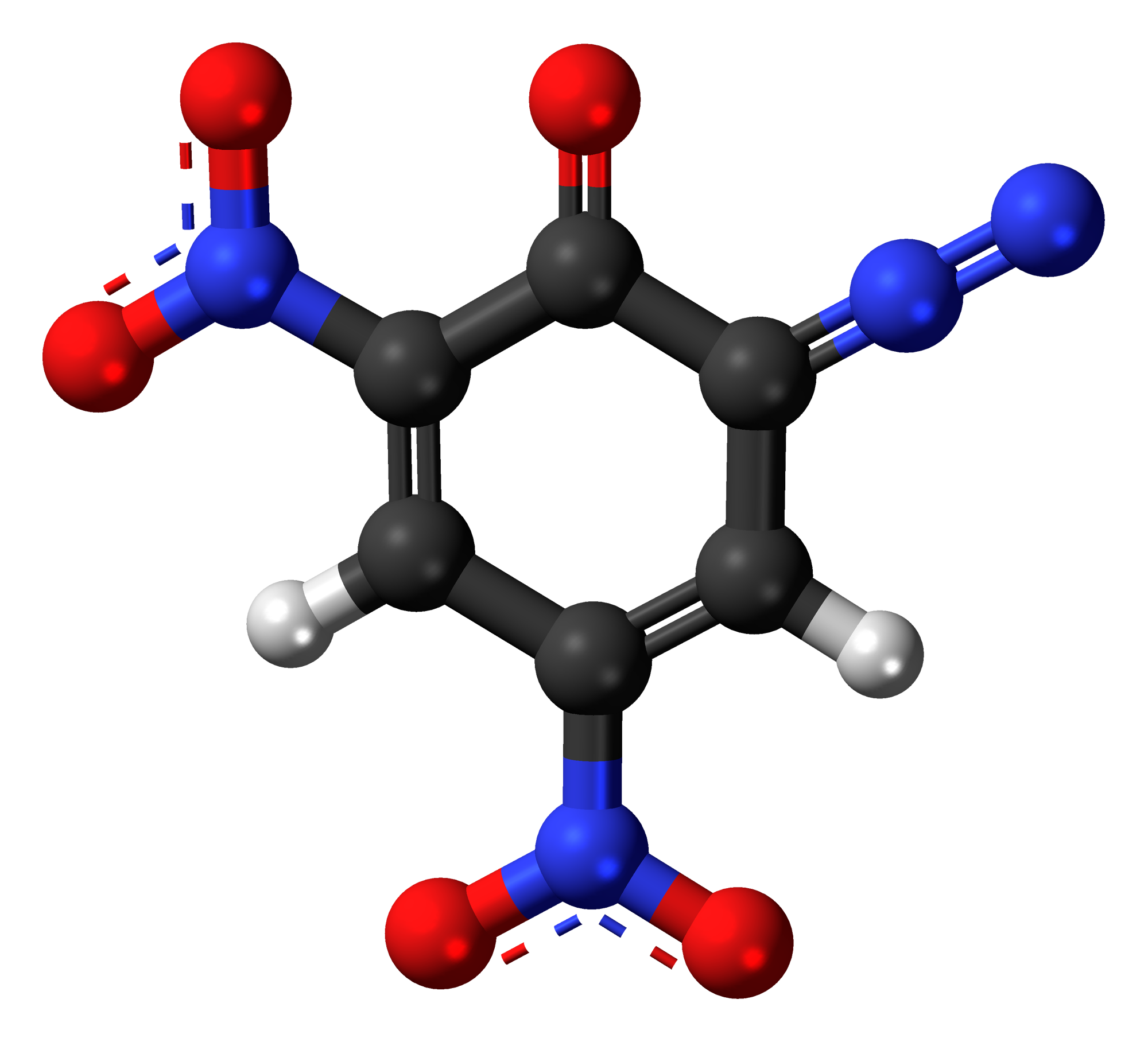
Non-radical diazo structure
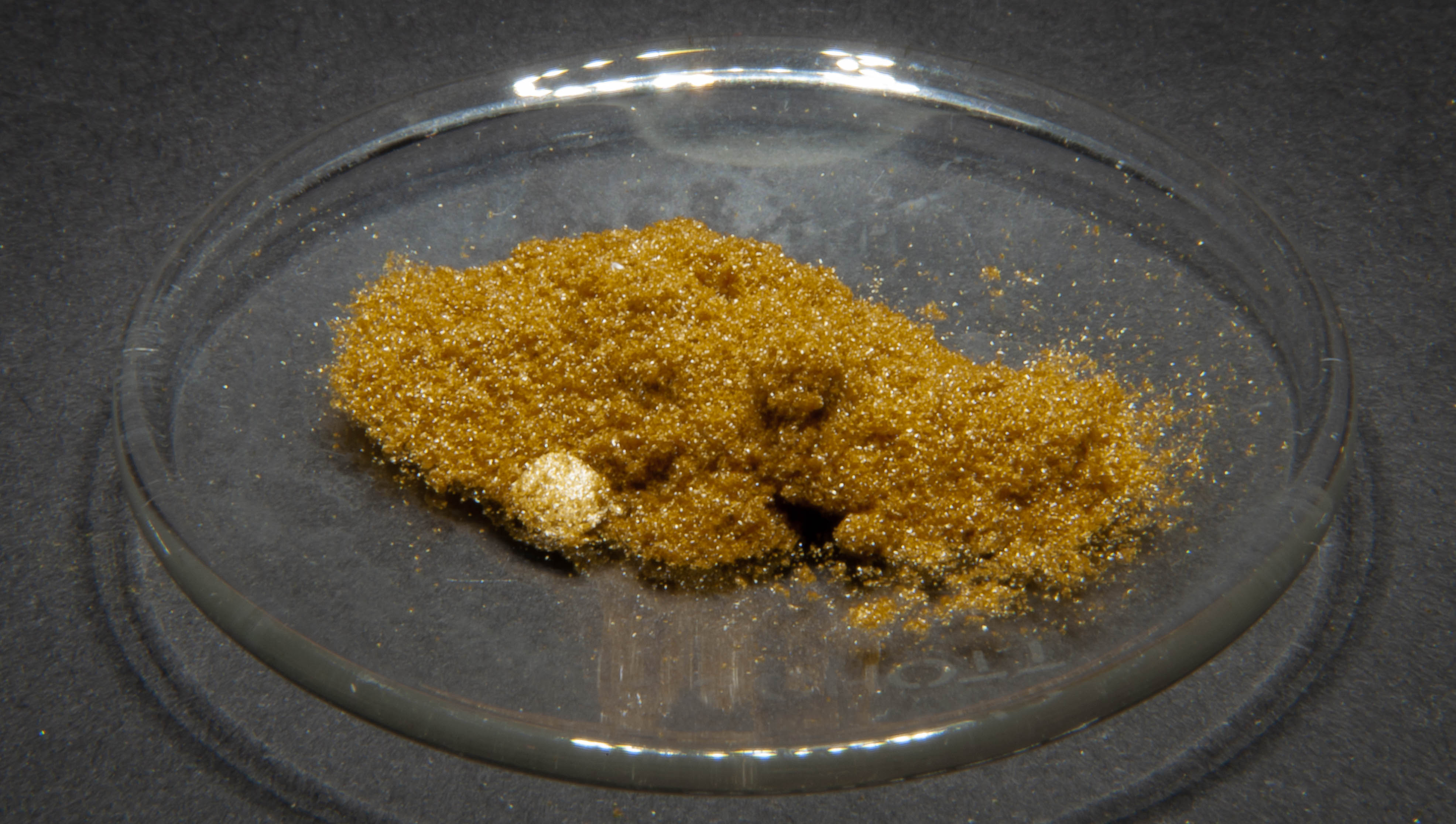

Names
- Preferred IUPAC name 6-Diazo-2,4-dinitrocyclohexa-2,4-dien-1-one

Identifiers
CAS Number	4682-03-5
3D model (JSmol)	Interactive image
Abbreviations	DDNP
ChemSpider	4576415
ECHA InfoCard	100.022.849
EC Number	225-134-9
PubChem CID	5463880
UNII	CV76O0RICT
CompTox Dashboard (EPA)	DTXSID00884100
- InChI: InChI=1S/C6H2N4O5/c7-8-4-1-3(9(12)13)2-5(6(4)11)10(14)15/h1-2H Key: IUKSYUOJRHDWRR-UHFFFAOYSA-N
- SMILES: [N]=[N]=C(C=C([N+]([O-])=O)C=C1[N+]([O-])=O)C1=O

Properties
Chemical formula	C_{6}H_{2}N_{4}O_{5}
Molar mass	210.105 g·mol^{−1}
Appearance	Yellow crystals
Density	1.71–1.72 g/cm^{−3} (pure); 1.63–1.65 g/cm^{−3} (technical grade)
Melting point	157–158 °C (315–316 °F; 430–431 K) (with decomposition)
Solubility in water	0.8 g/L (25 °C)
Solubility	Soluble in acetone, acetic acid, nitrobenzene
- Except where otherwise noted, data are given for materials in their standard state (at 25 °C [77 °F], 100 kPa). verify (what is ?) Infobox references

Diazodinitrophenol (DDNP) was one of the first diazonium or diazo compounds ever produced; it was subsequently used to make dyes and explosives. It forms yellow crystals in pure form; however, the color of impure forms may vary from dark yellow to green to dark brown. It is soluble in acetic acid, acetone, concentrated hydrochloric acid, like most non-polar solvents and is slightly soluble in water.

A solution of cold sodium hydroxide may be used to destroy it. DDNP may be desensitized by immersing it in water, as it does not react in water at normal temperature. It is less sensitive to impact but more powerful than mercury fulminate and almost as powerful as lead azide. The sensitivity of DDNP to friction is much less than that of mercury fulminate and lead azide.

DDNP is used with other materials to form priming mixtures, particularly where a high sensitivity to flame or heat is desired. DDNP is often used as an initiating explosive in propellant primer devices and is a substitute for lead styphnate in what are termed "green" or "non-toxic" (lead free) priming explosive compositions. Lead free primers have been judged as inadequate for service use in firearms due to weak and uneven initiation compared to lead based primers.

== History ==
Diazodinitrophenol was first prepared in 1858 by the German chemist Peter Griess. It was among the first diazo compounds and for a long time thereafter it was used as a starting material for dyes. Although Griess had mentioned in 1859 that diazodinitrophenol exploded upon heating, it was not until 1892 that diazodinitrophenol was first used as an explosive – when Wilhelm Will and Friedrich Lenze, German chemists at the Militär-Versuchsamt (military research office) in Spandau, Germany, began to investigate azides as potential initiators of explosives. The research was conducted secretly. After a fatal accident, the work was discontinued.

== Structure ==
As of 2013, its exact bonding and structure was still unclear. It has variously been described as a diazonium compound or diazo compound.

== Synthesis ==
DDNP can be synthesized by the reaction of nitrous acid with picramic acid.
