= Lead styphnate =

Names
- Preferred IUPAC name Lead(II) 2,4,6-trinitrobenzene-1,3-bis(olate)
- Other names Lead 2,4,6-trinitrobenzene-1,3-diolate Lead 2,4,6-trinitro-m-phenylene dioxide 1,3-Benzenediol, 2,4,6-trinitro-, lead(2+) salt (1:1); Lead tricinate Lead trinitroresorcinate Tricinat

Identifiers
CAS Number	15245-44-0
3D model (JSmol)	Interactive image
ChemSpider	55674
ECHA InfoCard	100.035.703
EC Number	239-290-0
PubChem CID	61789
UNII	0T8SE91KOP
UN number	0130
CompTox Dashboard (EPA)	DTXSID10890757
- InChI: InChI=1S/C6H3N3O8.Pb/c10-5-2(7(12)13)1-3(8(14)15)6(11)4(5)9(16)17;/h1,10-11H;/q;+2/p-2 Key: WETZJIOEDGMBMA-UHFFFAOYSA-L; InChI=1/C6H3N3O8.Pb/c10-5-2(7(12)13)1-3(8(14)15)6(11)4(5)9(16)17;/h1,10-11H;/q;+2/p-2 Key: WETZJIOEDGMBMA-NUQVWONBAY
- SMILES: c1c(c(c(c(c1[N+](=O)[O-])[O-])[N+](=O)[O-])[O-])[N+](=O)[O-].[Pb+2]

Properties
Chemical formula	C_{6}HN_{3}O_{8}Pb
Molar mass	450.288 g/mol
Density	3.06 to 3.1 g cm^{−3}

Explosive data
Shock sensitivity	High
Friction sensitivity	High
Detonation velocity	5200 m/s

Hazards
- GHS labelling
Pictograms	(GHS01: Explosive) (GHS07: Exclamation mark) (GHS08: Health hazard) (GHS09: Environmental hazard)
Signal word	Danger
Hazard statements	H200, H302, H332, H360Df, H373, H410
NFPA 704 (fire diamond)	4 0 3
Autoignition temperature	330 °C (626 °F; 603 K)
Safety data sheet (SDS)	Oxford MSDS
- Except where otherwise noted, data are given for materials in their standard state (at 25 °C [77 °F], 100 kPa). verify (what is ?) Infobox references

Lead styphnate (lead 2,4,6-trinitroresorcinate, C_{6}HN_{3}O_{8}Pb), whose name is derived from styphnic acid, is an explosive used as a component in primer and detonator mixtures for less sensitive secondary explosives. Lead styphnate is only slightly soluble in water and methanol. Samples of lead styphnate vary in color from yellow to gold, orange, reddish-brown, to brown. Lead styphnate is known in various polymorphs, hydrates, and basic salts. Normal lead styphnate monohydrate, monobasic lead styphnate, tribasic lead styphnate dihydrate, and pentabasic lead styphnate dehydrate as well as α, β polymorphs of lead styphnate exist.

Lead styphnate forms six-sided crystals of the monohydrate and small rectangular crystals. Lead styphnate is particularly sensitive to fire and the discharge of static electricity. Long thin crystals are particularly sensitive. Lead styphnate does not react with other metals and is less sensitive to shock and friction than mercury fulminate or lead azide. It is stable in storage, even at elevated temperatures. As with other lead-containing compounds, lead styphnate is toxic owing to heavy metal poisoning.

== Preparation ==
Lead styphnate (or, as it was then called, trinitro-orcinate) was discovered along with many other trinitroresorcinate salts by British chemist John Stenhouse in 1871, the synthesis route involving action of trinitroresorcinol on lead acetate.

In 1919, Austrian chemist Edmund von Herz first established a preparation of anhydrous normal lead styphnate by the reaction of magnesium styphnate with lead acetate in the presence of nitric acid.

{C_{6}N_{3}O_{8}}MgH_{2}O + Pb(CH_{3}CO_{2})_{2} → {C_{6}N_{3}O_{8}}PbH_{2}O + Mg(CH_{3}CO_{2})_{2}

== Structure ==
Normal lead styphnate exists as α and β polymorphs, both being monoclinic crystals. The lead centres are seven-coordinate and are bridged via oxygen bridges. The water molecule is coordinated to the metal and is also hydrogen-bonded to the anion. Many of the Pb-O distances are short, indicating some degree of covalency. The styphnate ions lie in approximately parallel planes linked by Pb atoms.

== Properties ==
Lead styphnate's heat of formation is −835 kJ mol^{−1}. The loss of water leads to the formation of a sensitive anhydrous material with a density of 2.9 g cm^{−3}. The variation of colors remains unexplained. Lead styphnate has a detonation velocity of 5.2 km/s and an explosion temperature of 265–280 °C after five seconds.

== Applications ==
Lead styphnate is mainly used in small arms ammunition for military and commercial applications. It serves as a primary explosive used in firearms primers, which will ignite upon a simple impact. It is similarly used in blank cartridges for powder-actuated nail guns. Lead styphnate is also used as primer in microthrusters for small satellite stationkeeping. In order to replace traditional mercury fulminate in cap compositions, lead styphnate is sensitised by the addition of a small quantity of tetrazine. Typical cap compositions would also contain scintillating compounds like antimony sulphide and calcum silicide.
