= 2017 Las Vegas shooting conspiracy theories =

Conspiracy theories regarding the 2017 Las Vegas shooting

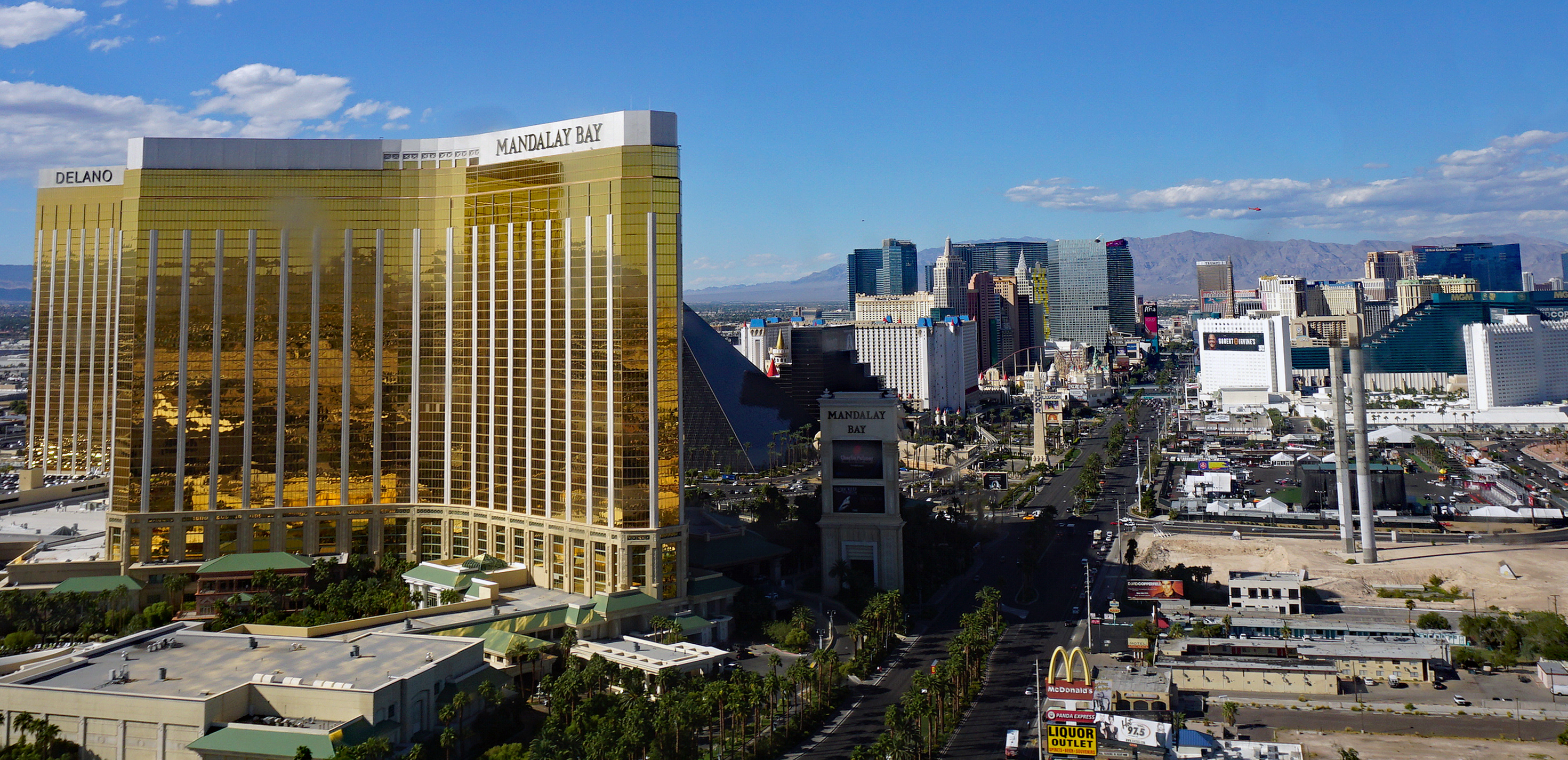
Aerial photos of Las Vegas Village and Festival Grounds on the Las Vegas Strip, Nevada, taken a week before the Route 91 Harvest Festival.

There are some conspiracy theories about the 2017 Las Vegas shooting, the deadliest mass shooting in American history. These hypotheses offer alternate explanations to the official version of the incident, including speculation about the involvement of shooters other than the identified perpetrator, Stephen Paddock.

One of the most popular conspiracy theories suggests the involvement of several shooters, which contradicts the official narrative that Stephen Paddock acted alone. This argument contends that additional gunmen were involved in the massacre, contesting the sole responsibility assigned to Paddock by law enforcement investigations. There is speculation that law enforcement, such as the FBI and Las Vegas Metropolitan Police Department are concealing information concerning the shooting, such as the motive or potential involvement of others. Conspiracy theories circulating online and in certain fringe groups contend that the federal government staged the 2017 Las Vegas shooting in order to justify the ban on bump stocks. The U.S Justice Department outlawed bump stocks in December 2018, but the Supreme Court reversed the decision in 2024 due to a lack of a legislative justification. Conspiracy theories say that Stephen Paddock utilized a machine gun, such as a M249 or M240, rather than the AR-15-style rifles discovered by law enforcement. Despite official investigations and evidence indicating the use of various firearms, including rifles, some individuals continue to believe in the machine gun theory. Accusations that the shooting did not occur or was orchestrated by "crisis actors" were among the theories. This interpretation is often fueled by a combination of disbelief in official narratives, the complexity and scale of the attack, and the quick spread of unconfirmed information online. Bruce Paddock, Stephen Paddock's brother, was arrested in October 2017 and charged with possessing over 600 photos of child pornography. Bruce was reportedly bragging about his brother's acts, which prompted workers at his assisted living home in North Hollywood, California, to notify the authorities. No motive has been found for the Las Vegas shooting as of 2026.

== Background ==
On October 1, 2017, Stephen Paddock opened fire from his 32nd-floor hotel room at the Mandalay Bay during the Route 91 Harvest music festival in Las Vegas, killing 60 and injuring hundreds more. Paddock was discovered dead in his room from a self-inflicted gunshot wound, and his motive is unknown.

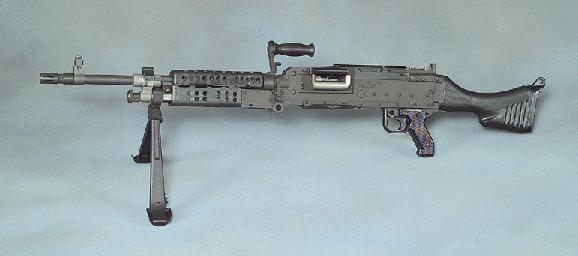
The M240 machine gun, a widely used weapon in the military, has appeared in various conspiracy theories surrounding the Las Vegas shooting that occurred on October 1, 2017.

Following the shooting, several conspiracy theories, misinformation, and fake news circulated on social media platforms such as YouTube and Facebook. The Federal Bureau of Investigation has always stated that there was just one gunman in the 2017 Las Vegas mass shooting, dismissing suggestions of additional gunmen. The investigation found that Stephen Paddock acted alone, which is supported by considerable evidence, including witness testimony, ballistic analysis, and CCTV footage. Some individuals are skeptical and frustrated with the FBI's determination that Stephen Paddock did not utilize machine guns during the Las Vegas shooting. This is due in part to the high rate of fire heard during the attack, which many believed sounded like machine guns. Many witnesses, particularly those who recorded videos, claimed that a machine gun was used in the attack. Alternative accounts of the Las Vegas shooting emerged almost immediately after the attack on October 1, 2017. Millions of people watched videos classified as "fake news" or "conspiracy theories," which offered various interpretations of the events. However, several of these videos were later banned by YouTube and Google, which found the content inappropriate.

== Theories ==
=== Political motivation ===
The conspiracy theory surrounding the 2017 Las Vegas shooting suggests that there was government involvement or cover-up due to inconsistencies in the official narrative and the quick closure of the investigation.

==== Antifa and left-wing connections ====
According to conspiracy theories, the gunman, Stephen Paddock, was linked with antifa, an anti-fascist movement. Radio host and conspiracy theorist Alex Jones popularized this theory, claiming that Paddock selected a country music festival because it was likely to be attended by "pro-gun folks and Trump supporters." His theories have been heavily criticized by mainstream media and law enforcement for missing evidence and "spreading disinformation." In 2017, Infowars stated that an unknown source said the FBI discovered antifa literature in Stephen Paddock's hotel room, implying a link to antifa. However, no evidence supports any link between Paddock and antifa. Various contradicting explanations about Paddock's motivations arose as a result of a 4chan scheme to create fake narratives. These included assertions that Paddock had recently converted to Islam, wrongly portraying him as a left-leaning Democrat who watched mainstream liberal media, and that he was a "antifa Bernie Bro."

==== Islamic State involvement theory ====
Another assumption suggested that Paddock was associated with ISIS, which claimed responsibility for the massacre through its Amaq News Agency. Despite the group's history of claiming credit for various attacks, such as the Pulse nightclub shooting in 2016, regardless of actual involvement, this theory found support among certain conspiracy theorists. The FBI determined that Stephen Paddock, the perpetrator of the 2017 Las Vegas massacre, had no ties to ISIS or any other international terrorist organization. Similarly, the Las Vegas Metropolitan Police Department stated that their investigation found no ties between Paddock and any terrorist organization. They concentrated on determining Paddock's motivation and the circumstances surrounding the shooting. This early speculation caused confusion and misinformation in the public.

Brad Johnson, a retired CIA officer, and Rich Higgins, a former Pentagon official who served on the National Security Council during the Trump administration, argue that the Las Vegas shooting was orchestrated by a coalition of left-wing activists and Islamic extremists with political motives. They assert that Stephen Paddock’s actions were designed to undermine President Trump's leadership and create instability. According to their theory, the official narrative claiming Paddock acted alone is a deliberate diversion from a broader conspiracy. In a Politico report, Higgins, who served as the National Security Council's strategic planning director for a few months, stated that there is substantial evidence linking ISIS to the attack.

==== Saudi Arabia ====
Some theorists believe the shooting was an effort to assassinate a Saudi prince, most likely Mohammed bin Salman, who conspiracy theorists claim was staying at the Four Seasons Hotel, which occupies the top floors of Mandalay Bay. It is allegedly able to be proven due to the 2017–2019 Saudi Arabian purge which was approximately one month after the shooting. Saudi Arabia's Public Investment Fund has made significant investments in MGM, which owns Mandalay Bay and much of the Las Vegas Strip. This investment is part of an overall effort to diversify its economy and minimize reliance on oil earnings.

=== Foreknowledge ===
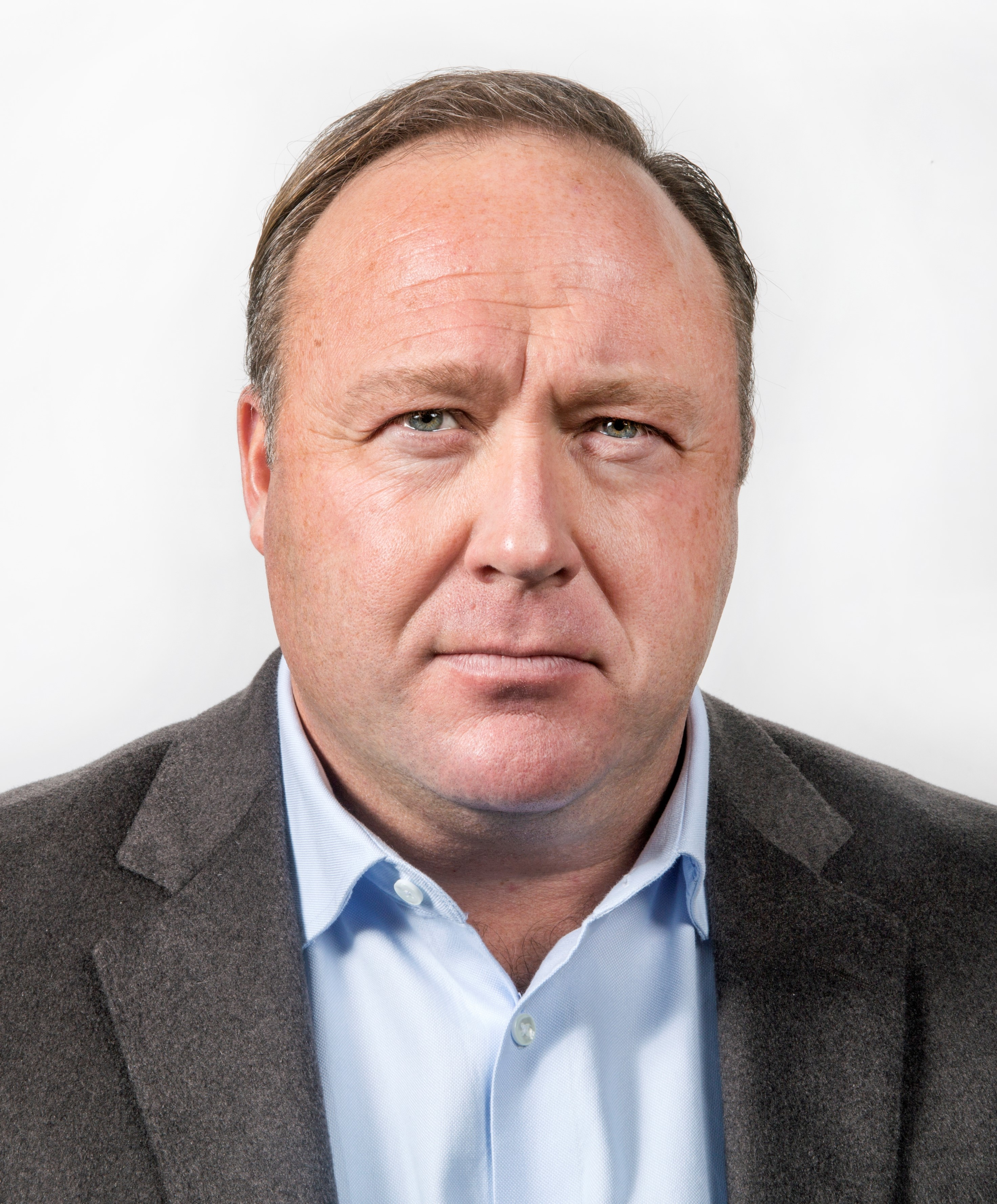
Alex Jones has suggested that the shooting might have been part of a larger, orchestrated event, and he has made various claims about government and media cover-ups.

The most prominent conspiracy theory is that the killing was coordinated or supported by members of the United States government or by members of the "deep state." Proponents of this view, including Alex Jones, claim that the incident was a false flag operation aimed to push a certain political objective, such as gun control. Conspiracy theorists frequently use the bump stock ban implemented in response to mass shootings to back up their accusations. Some conspiracy theorists have referenced Las Vegas police's delayed response to Stephen Paddock's room during the shooting to back up their assertions. The leaking of crime scene photographs from Stephen Paddock's suite after the Las Vegas massacre has fueled conspiracy theories due to questions of lack of transparency. Concerns are raised regarding whether the leaked images properly show the crime scene as discovered by detectives. Speculations of tampering, such as relocating Paddock's body before documentation, call into question the murder scene's initial conditions.

According to many witnesses, 45 minutes before the massacre, an unknown woman exclaimed, "You're all going to fucking die" to concertgoers. She and the man she was with were then led out by security. Police never determined whether the woman's warning was related to the attack.

Following the Las Vegas shooting, MGM witnessed a significant decrease in its stock price. Conspiracy theorists claim that unproven unusual stock market activity involving MGM Resorts International (which owns Mandalay Bay, where the shooter was positioned), such as a decline in MGM Resorts' stock price and unusual trade volumes prior to the attack, is evidence of foreknowledge. This is similar to the 9/11 conspiracy theories in that both use unusual stock market activity as evidence of prior knowledge of a major event. Financial analysis and investigative reports frequently demonstrate that unusual trading behavior does not always imply knowledge of an impending incident. These arguments remain hypothetical in the absence of hard proof connecting the trade activity to the shooting.

An anonymous 4chan member going by the name "John" posted a warning to "stay away" from Las Vegas on the sixteenth anniversary of 9/11, citing an imminent deadly attack. John, who merely sent cryptic messages, suggested staying away from big parties in Henderson and Las Vegas. He asserted that he knew in advance of a significant incident that was about to occur. Examination of the messages' timestamps and substance showed that many of them were posted after the shooting had already begun or were so ambiguous as to be unreliable warnings.

=== Multiple shooters theory ===
There is speculation that Stephen Paddock did not act alone, suggesting the involvement of multiple shooters. This theory posits that Paddock may have been framed as a fall guy by the actual perpetrators of the attack. There were rumors that Las Vegas police may have referenced numerous shooters over radio exchanges during the early stages of the October 1, 2017, massacre. Proponents of this conspiracy theory often selectively reference eyewitness testimonies and raise questions about how Paddock managed to transport numerous weapons into his hotel room. Some eyewitness accounts of the chaotic event have indeed included claims of multiple shooters, such as one posted to social media shortly after the shooting by a survivor named Kymberley Suchomel. Suchomel, who had epilepsy and was prone to seizures, died suddenly a week after the shooting, and because she had not been injured in the shooting itself, her death has been used by some conspiracy theorists as evidence of a supposed coverup. However, none of the eyewitness accounts—including Suchomel's—claiming the existence of multiple shooters were supported by tangible evidence, and numerous independent researchers and fact-checking organizations have disproven the multiple shooter theory. They cite forensic evidence, witness accounts, and investigative results that all support the conclusion of a single gunman. Assistant Sheriff Todd Fasulo and Sheriff Joe Lombardo both highlighted that Paddock acted alone, despite the intricacy of the attack and the amount of gear he was able to get into the hotel.

Nonetheless, the theory of multiple shooters has been propagated by various alternative media sites and spread on major social media networks. A 30-minute video published by Natural News—which purported to use forensic sound analysis to prove the existence of multiple shooters—was removed from YouTube in 2018 following the termination of the TheHealthRanger channel; it had amassed one million views. Similar videos uploaded around the same time, including several that reported a shooter at the Bellagio Hotel, were also removed. Other conspiracy theorists have focused on a blue strobe light visible in some videos, arguing that it could have been coming from a different window than the white and orange flashes interpreted as gunfire. This is used to support their claims that the light flashes could have come from different sources or locations, which would imply the existence of multiple shooters. Even more radical interpretations of the multiple shooter theory, uploaded on YouTube and Reddit, claim that helicopters were involved in the incident, used to open fire on the crowd at the Route 91 Harvest festival, either as gunships or attack helicopters, scenarios that would imply government officials were involved in perpetrating the attack.
