= Stephen Paddock =

American mass murderer (1953–2017)

- Paddock in a 2002 family photo
- Born: Stephen Craig Paddock; April 12, 1953; Clinton, Iowa, U.S.
- Died: October 1, 2017 (aged 64); Paradise, Nevada, U.S.
- Cause of death: Suicide by gunshot
- Education: Sun Valley High School; John H. Francis Polytechnic High School; California State University, Northridge
- Occupations: Retired; former Postal worker, auditor for the Internal Revenue Service, internal auditor for the Defense Contract Audit Agency, real estate and property manager
- Known for: Perpetrator of the 2017 Las Vegas shooting
- Relatives: Benjamin Hoskins Paddock (father); Eric Paddock (brother); Patrick Paddock II (brother)
- Motive: Unknown

Details
- Date: October 1, 2017; 9 years ago ≈ 10:05 – 10:15 pm
- Locations: Las Vegas Strip, Paradise, Nevada, U.S.
- Target: Route 91 Harvest music festival audience
- Killed: 60 (Note: Including two people who died in 2019 and 2020.)
- Injured: ≈ 867 (413+ by gunfire or shrapnel)

Stephen Craig Paddock (April 12, 1953 – October 1, 2017) was an American mass murderer who perpetrated the 2017 Las Vegas shooting, the deadliest mass shooting and considered one of the worst mass murders in American history.

Paddock grew up in a poor household and began his career as an auditor before becoming wealthy from investing in and managing apartment buildings. At the time of the shooting, Paddock was a hobby pilot and an avid video poker gambler who lived reclusively in Mesquite, Nevada. On October 1, 2017, Paddock opened fire into a crowd of about 22,000 concertgoers attending a country music festival on the Las Vegas Strip, killing 60 people (Note: 58 people died at the scene or in hospitals soon afterwards. A female survivor who died from complications of her injuries on November 15, 2019, was officially declared as a fatality in the shooting in August 2020. Another female survivor also died from gunshot wound complications on May 26, 2020, and was reported as a fatality in the shooting in September. The Las Vegas police updated the official death toll from 58 to 60 on October 1, 2020, the third anniversary of the shooting.) and injuring approximately 867 (at least 413 of whom were wounded by gunfire). Paddock killed himself in his suite at the Mandalay Bay hotel following the shooting. Paddock's motive for the shooting is unknown, and remains a subject of speculation.

== Early years and education ==
Paddock was born on April 12,1953, in Clinton, Iowa, where his family lived at the time. He was the oldest of four sons of Benjamin Paddock and Dolores Hudson. Shortly after his birth, his family relocated to Tucson, Arizona. Benjamin was a bank robber who was arrested in Arizona in 1960 when Stephen was seven years old. Benjamin was later convicted and escaped prison in 1969, subsequently appearing on the FBI's most-wanted list.

According to Stephen's brother Eric, "[Benjamin] was never with my mom" and "we didn't grow up under his influence." After Benjamin was arrested, their mother told the children that their father had died in a car accident and kept his status as a bank robber a secret from the family. Dolores proceeded to move her sons to the Sun Valley neighborhood of Los Angeles, where Stephen spent his remaining childhood and adolescence in a low-income household. Dolores worked as a secretary to support the family. According to one of Paddock's ex-wives in a police interview, he had spoken about how growing up with a single mother and the family's financial instability caused him to prioritize being self-reliant and self-sustaining.

Another one of Stephen's brothers, Patrick Paddock II, said that he and his brothers all grew up with anger, but that Stephen seemed the least affected. "My brother was the most boring one in the family," Patrick said of Stephen. "He was the least violent one." A former high school classmate described Stephen as a "brainy kid" set apart by his "irreverence toward authority."

Paddock attended Richard E. Byrd Middle School, Sun Valley High School, and John H. Francis Polytechnic High School, where he graduated in 1971. He went on to graduate from California State University, Northridge, in 1977, with a degree in business administration.

== Career and gambling ==
Paddock worked as a postal worker from 1975 to 1978. After that, he worked for the Internal Revenue Service until 1984. In 1985, he worked as an auditor for the Defense Contract Audit Agency. From 1985 to 1988, Paddock worked as an internal auditor for a company that later merged into Lockheed Martin. He was known to have run a real-estate business with his brother Eric.

Paddock lived in the Greater Los Angeles Area and owned real estate in Panorama City, Cerritos, and North Hollywood from the 1970s to early 2000s. He also owned two apartment buildings in Hawthorne, California. In addition, he owned an apartment complex in Mesquite, Texas, which he sold in 2012.

Relatives said Paddock was worth at least US$2 million when he sold off the real-estate business. Among his most profitable investments was an apartment complex purchased in 2004 which gave him more than $500,000 in annual income by 2011. IRS records show he made $6 million in profits from its sale in 2015.

Paddock was an avid gambler, and although the extent to which he profited from it is not clear, his reported gambling winnings might have been substantial. He was sometimes seen in high-limit rooms, but he was not well known among high-stakes gamblers in Las Vegas and was not considered a "whale" (high roller) by the casinos. His game of choice was video poker, which he had played for over 25 years. He usually gambled after dark and slept during the day; he disliked being out in the sun.

== Personal life ==
Paddock was married and divorced twice and had no children. He was first married from 1977 to 1979 and for the second time from 1985 to 1990, both marriages in Los Angeles County, California. Family members say he stayed on good terms with his ex-wives.

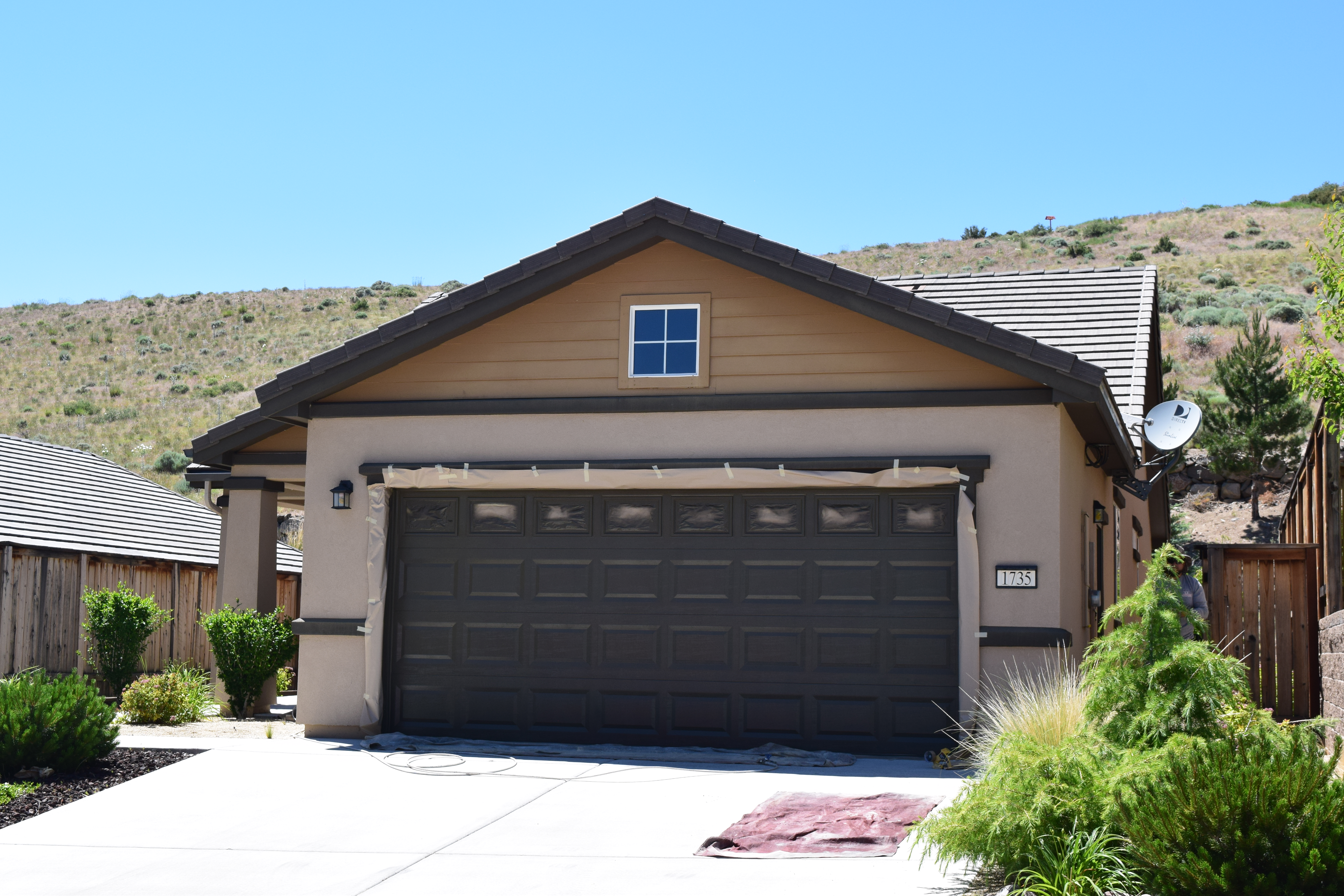
Paddock's Reno home in June 2019

Paddock lived in Texas and California, and then in a retirement community in Melbourne, Florida, from 2013 to 2015. In 2016, he moved from Florida to another retirement home in Mesquite, Nevada. According to property records he bought a new house in Mesquite in January 2015 and sold his two-bedroom home in Melbourne.

Paddock lived in Mesquite with his girlfriend whom he had met several years before in Reno, Nevada. According to neighbors, they also lived together in Reno. Many Mesquite residents recalled only seeing him around town; those familiar with Paddock described him as someone who did not speak much and kept a low profile. The local gun owner community never saw him at any of the gun clubs or shooting ranges, including makeshift ones in the nearby desert.

An Australian acquaintance said he met Paddock in the United States and in the Philippines. He described Paddock as intelligent and methodical. In his account, Paddock said he had won money by applying algorithms to gambling on machines. Paddock was conversant in gun laws and in defending his view of the Second Amendment. The acquaintance considered Paddock a generous man whenever he and his girlfriend visited him.

In 2010, Paddock applied for and received a United States passport. He went on 20 cruise ship voyages, visiting several foreign ports including ones in Spain, Italy, Greece, Jordan, and the United Arab Emirates. He was accompanied by his girlfriend on nine of them. They went to the Philippines together in 2013 and 2014. During the last year of his life, they traveled on a cruise to the Middle East. Paddock had his pilot's license since at least 2004 and owned two small planes, one being a Cirrus SR20 (registration N5343M).

Paddock's only recorded interaction with law enforcement was a minor traffic citation years before the shooting, which he settled in court. According to court records, Paddock also sued the Cosmopolitan of Las Vegas in September 2012, saying he "slipped and fell on an obstruction on the floor" and was injured as a result; the lawsuit settled, and was dismissed with prejudice in October 2014.

=== Leading up to the shooting ===
Paddock's gun purchases spiked significantly between October 2016 and September 28, 2017. He purchased over 55 firearms, the majority of them rifles, according to Bureau of Alcohol, Tobacco, Firearms and Explosives. He also purchased a number of firearm-related accessories. Prior to that, he purchased approximately 29 firearms between 1982 and September 2016, mainly handguns and shotguns. His girlfriend noticed the increase of firearm-related purchases but believed his interest in guns was just a hobby.

At his suggestion, two weeks before the attack, his girlfriend went to her native country, the Philippines. Paddock bought her a surprise airline ticket and soon after wired her $100,000 to buy a house there. Most of their communication during this time was through email and text message. He was spotted in Las Vegas with another woman, reported by investigators to be a sex worker. It was later confirmed that this woman was not an accomplice nor considered a suspect, and her name has not been released. Two days prior to the shooting, Paddock was recorded by a home surveillance system driving alone to an area for target practice located near his home.

== 2017 Las Vegas shooting ==
=== Sequence of events ===
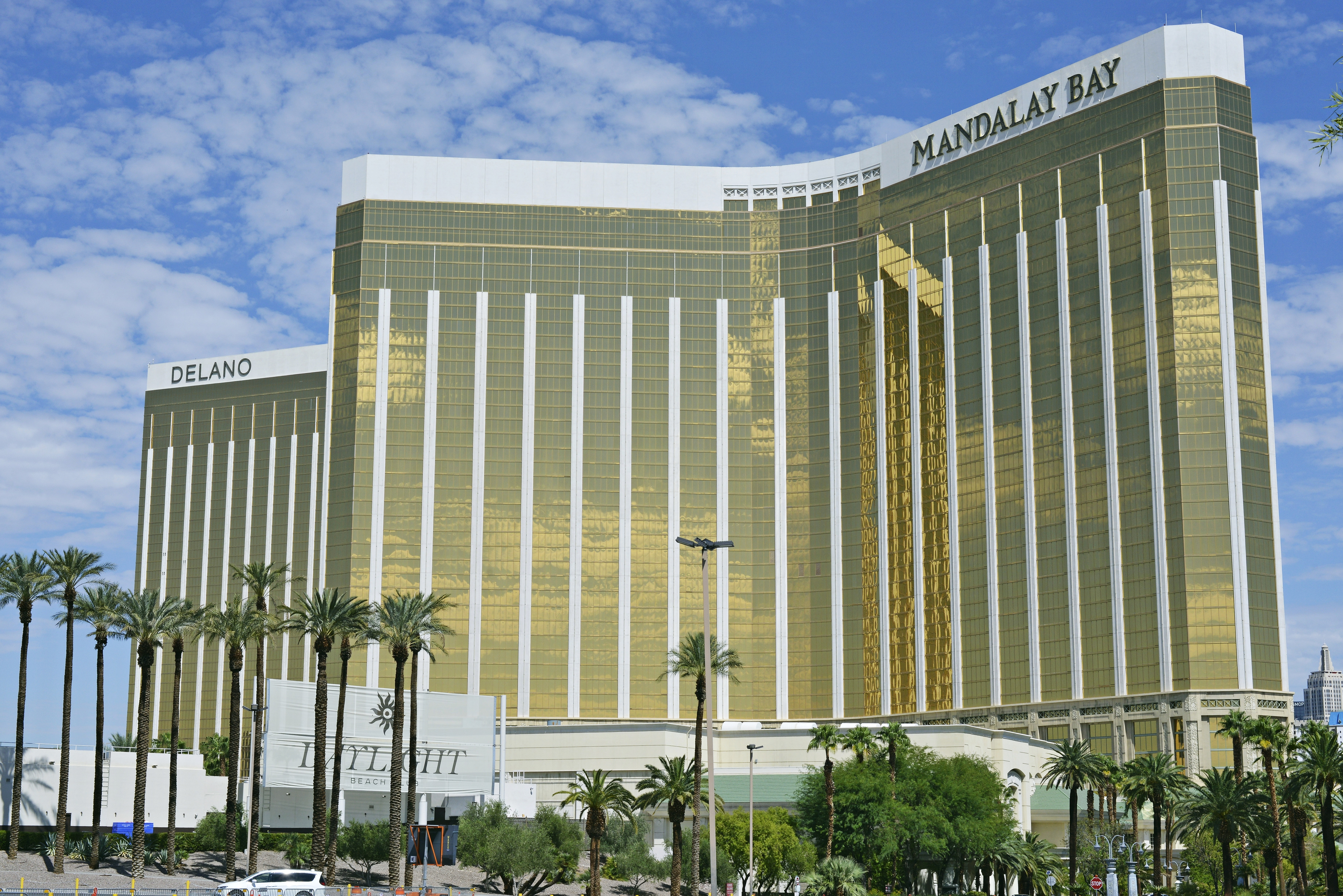
Paddock opened fire from his suite on the 32nd floor of Mandalay Bay.

On the night of October 1, 2017, starting at 10:05 p.m., Paddock fired over 1,000 rifle rounds from his hotel room, Room 32‑135 at the Mandalay Bay Hotel and Casino, onto a large crowd of concertgoers at the Route 91 Harvest music festival on the Las Vegas Strip, ultimately killing 60 people and wounding 867 others. He then shot and killed himself.

Paddock meticulously planned the attack. On September 25, six days before the shooting, he checked into the hotel with 10 shooting-range bags and a computer.

Paddock indiscriminately fired rifle rounds from the 32nd floor of the Mandalay Bay hotel toward the concertgoers at Las Vegas Village.

On September 29, he moved into an additional suite, 32–134, connected to the first one; both rooms overlooked the festival grounds. He stayed in both in the days leading up to the shooting. After Paddock killed himself, the police found 23 rifles and one handgun inside his rooms. They included fourteen .223-caliber AR-15 type rifles, eight .308 caliber AR-10 type rifles, one .308 caliber Ruger American bolt-action rifle, and one .38 caliber Smith & Wesson model 342 revolver, all "very expensive," according to a law enforcement source. His arsenal included a large quantity of ammunition in special high-capacity magazines holding up to 100 cartridges each. Some of the rifles were resting on bipods, and were equipped with high-tech telescopic sights. All fourteen AR-15-type rifles were outfitted with bump stocks that make the act of using recoil to assist in pulling the trigger again easier and faster, increasing the weapon's rate of fire. Audio recordings of the attack indicated Paddock used these stocks to fire at the crowd in rapid succession.

At some point during the attack on concertgoers, Paddock – who had placed a webcam on a service cart outside his room – fired about 35 rounds through his door. The shots wounded approaching hotel security guard Jesus Campos. The unarmed Campos had attempted to enter the 32nd floor first at 9:59 pm on an unrelated matter but found the door to the hallway screwed shut by Paddock. At 10:05 pm, Paddock began firing hundreds of rounds in rapid succession at the crowd below. He initially started off with a few single gunshots before firing in prolonged bursts. He stopped shooting ten minutes later at 10:15 pm. It is speculated that at that time Paddock committed suicide, shooting himself through the mouth.

According to the chronology of events established by the authorities in the following days, the first two police officers reached the 32nd floor of the hotel at 10:17 pm. A minute later, they were shown the location of Paddock's door. Between 10:26 and 10:30 pm, an additional eight LVMPD officers joined them and began clearing other suites along the 32nd floor hallway. At 10:55 pm, eight SWAT team members entered the 32nd floor through the second stairwell nearest to Paddock's suite. Once all the other rooms on the floor had been cleared, at 11:20 pm — more than an hour after the first two officers arrived and 65 minutes after Paddock had ceased firing—police breached his door with an explosive charge and entered the room. Paddock was found dead from a self-inflicted gunshot to the head.

=== Investigation ===
In addition to the firearms and accessories found in Paddock's hotel room, there was a note that included handwritten calculations about where he needed to aim to maximize his accuracy. The note contained the actual distance to the target, his own elevation and the bullet trajectory relative to the line of fire. There were also several laptops in the suite, one of which was missing a hard drive. Computer forensics discovered hundreds of images of child pornography on the laptops. Paddock's brother, Bruce Paddock (referred to as "Daniel Paddock" in other sources), was arrested in Los Angeles in October in an unrelated child sexual abuse material investigation.

Ammonium nitrate, often used in improvised explosive devices, was found in Paddock's car trunk along with 1,600 rounds of ammunition and 50 pounds (23 kilograms) of Tannerite, a binary explosive used to make explosive targets for gun ranges. However, investigators clarified that while Paddock had "nefarious intent" with the material, he did not appear to have assembled an explosive device. An additional 19 firearms were found at his home.

Over the weekend following the shooting, Paddock's Reno home was broken into via the front door by an unknown perpetrator. Authorities stated nothing was known to have been taken, and confirmed that the FBI was revisiting his homes.

=== Motive ===
According to police, Paddock acted alone. His motive remains unknown. There has been some discussion around brain pathology initially thought to be benign as a possible contributor. Paddock's remains were sent to Stanford University to receive a more extensive analysis of his brain. The Stanford pathologists found no abnormalities present within the brain.

Investigators believe he was obsessed with cleanliness and possibly had bipolar disorder. Although a doctor did offer him antidepressants, he only accepted anxiety medication, and it was reported that he was fearful of medication and often refused to take it. The doctor also described Paddock as "odd" and showing "little emotion". Psychologists ex post facto have noted a distinct similarity between Paddock's demeanor and the psychological construct alexithymia, which might have modulated his decision to conduct the shooting given its association with various mass murderers throughout history.

The Islamic State (IS) claimed responsibility for the shooting, saying that Paddock had converted to Islam six months prior to the terrorist attack, and had renamed himself Abu Abdul Barr al-Amriki, but United States law enforcement officials have given no evidence of a connection between Paddock and IS. According to his Catholic girlfriend, Paddock described himself as an atheist and often said "your god doesn't love me."

=== Possible contributing factors ===
Paddock's girlfriend stated that he did not talk at length about politics and did not belong to any political organizations. In addition, Paddock increasingly complained of being sick and was sensitive to chemical smells.

During his last months, Paddock reportedly often smelled of alcohol in the early morning, and he appeared despondent. He was reported to have filled prescriptions for the anti-anxiety drug Valium in 2013, in 2016, and finally again in June 2017, the last being four months before the shooting. The chief medical officer of the Las Vegas Recovery Center said the effects of the drug can be magnified by alcohol, as confirmed by Michael First, a clinical psychiatry professor at Columbia University. Paddock's autopsy revealed he was not under the influence of any psychoactive drugs or alcohol at the time of the shooting, though his urine did contain benzodiazepines.

During an interview with local CBS affiliate KLAS-TV, Clark County Sheriff Joe Lombardo said Paddock had reportedly been losing "a significant amount of wealth" since September 2015, which led to his having "bouts of depression". According to his girlfriend, she noticed a decline of affection and intimacy towards her from Paddock, who had been romantic at first during their relationship; he attributed it to his declining health.

In March 2023, the Federal Bureau of Investigation (FBI) released documents that speculated Paddock's motive as discontent over the alleged negative treatment he and other high rollers had been receiving at Las Vegas casinos. However, the Las Vegas Metropolitan Police Department dismissed the report and reiterated their findings that the motive was inconclusive.

== In popular culture ==
- In rapper Eminem's song titled "Darkness" on his January 2020 album Music to Be Murdered By, the song and the accompanying music video portray Stephen Paddock's thought process before the shooting while also serving as a metaphor for Eminem's nervousness before a concert performance.
- A four-part Emmy-nominated documentary miniseries about the shooting, 11 Minutes, was released by Paramount+ in September 2022.
