= K. M. Leuschner =

Karl Moritz "K. M." Leuschner
- Born: August 22, 1878; Berlin, Germany
- Died: May 30, 1940 (aged 61); San Francisco, California, U.S.
- Occupation(s): Illustrator; Lithographer; Graphic designer; Cartographer; Art teacher
- Notable work: Greater Los Angeles: the Wonder City of America (1932 pictorial map)

Karl Moritz "K. M." Leuschner (August 22, 1878 – May 30, 1940) was a German‑American illustrator, lithographer, graphic designer, cartographer, and art teacher, best known for his 1932 pictorial bird's‑eye map of Los Angeles.

== Early life and education ==
Leuschner was born in Berlin, Germany. He emigrated to the United States on November 12, 1907. After briefly living in Rhode Island, he moved to Rochester, New York, where he began teaching and selling artwork.

== Career ==
In 1926, Leuschner relocated to Los Angeles, California. He pursued graduate education at the University of California, earning a Master of Fine Arts degree. During this period, he worked with lithography firms including the Western Lithograph Company and Metropolitan Surveys.

Leuschner also established himself as a respected art educator in Southern California. He taught at the Otis Art Institute (now Otis College of Art and Design), where he specialized in commercial illustration, drafting, and design fundamentals. His teaching style reflected a technical precision developed through his cartographic and lithographic background. Students under his instruction were exposed to both academic fine art principles and practical skills in applied graphics.

In addition to his work at Otis, Leuschner taught at several Los Angeles high schools, including Los Angeles High School and John H. Francis Polytechnic High School. His reputation as a patient and disciplined educator earned him a lasting legacy in the Los Angeles public school system. He eventually became a senior instructor in the Los Angeles City Schools system, where he continued teaching until shortly before his death. His dual expertise in fine and commercial art gave his students exposure to both aesthetic and technical disciplines, a rare blend at the time.

Throughout the 1930s, Leuschner balanced teaching with freelance design and map illustration work. His 1932 pictorial map of Los Angeles is widely considered his masterwork and was likely inspired in part by his teaching demonstrations of perspective and city planning visualization.

== Notable works ==
=== Greater Los Angeles: the Wonder City of America (1932) ===
Greater Los Angeles: the wonder city of America (1932), by K. M. Leuschner, Library of Congress

This detailed color pictorial map was published by Metropolitan Surveys and printed by the Western Lithograph Company in 1932. Measuring approximately 33 × 22 inches (84 × 54 cm), the map depicts Depression‑era Los Angeles with vivid color, meticulous detail, and humorous elements. It includes imagery of oil fields, movie studios, clubs, celebrity homes, sunbathers, and gambling ships, combining accurate geography with artistic license. The work blends civic boosterism with fantasy, reflecting the promotional aspirations of the time.

Original copies of the map are held in collections at the Library of Congress and the Bancroft Library at the University of California, Berkeley.

=== Commission and production ===
Leuschner's Greater Los Angeles: the Wonder City of America was created in 1932 for Metropolitan Surveys, a Los Angeles–based publisher known for promotional and civic materials. The map was printed by the Western Lithograph Company, a major commercial lithographer active in Southern California during the early 20th century.

The purpose of the map was likely promotional—designed during the early years of the Great Depression to inspire civic pride, attract tourism, and encourage business development in Los Angeles. It is part of a broader tradition of boosterist pictorial maps that depicted American cities as aspirational destinations filled with industry, leisure, and opportunity.

The map features a combination of geographic accuracy and artistic embellishment. In addition to well-known buildings and neighborhoods, Leuschner added whimsical and sensational elements, including gambling ships, celebrity homes, sunbathers, and oil rigs—making the work both a historical record and a stylized fantasy of Los Angeles life in the early 1930s.

The visual language of the map aligns with the Golden Age of pictorial cartography, in which maps were designed not only for navigation but also for storytelling, civic branding, and mass appeal.

== Personal life and death ==
Leuschner died on May 30, 1940, in San Francisco.

== Legacy ==
K. M. Leuschner's pictorial maps are now considered collectible artifacts of early 20th-century Los Angeles. His 1932 "Wonder City" map has been reproduced, cited, and displayed in historical exhibits and online archives. It remains a reference point for those studying the urban imagery and civic branding of Los Angeles during the interwar period.
