= Richard Higgins =

Richard Higgins may refer to:

- Richard W. Higgins (1922–1957), United States Army Air Forces jet pilot
- Richard Brendan Higgins (born 1944), Roman Catholic bishop
- William Richard Higgins (1945–1989), United States Marine Corps colonel
- Rich Higgins (1974–2022), Trump administration Director for Strategic Planning of the National Security Council
