= 2017 Las Vegas shooting =

Deadliest mass shooting in U.S. history

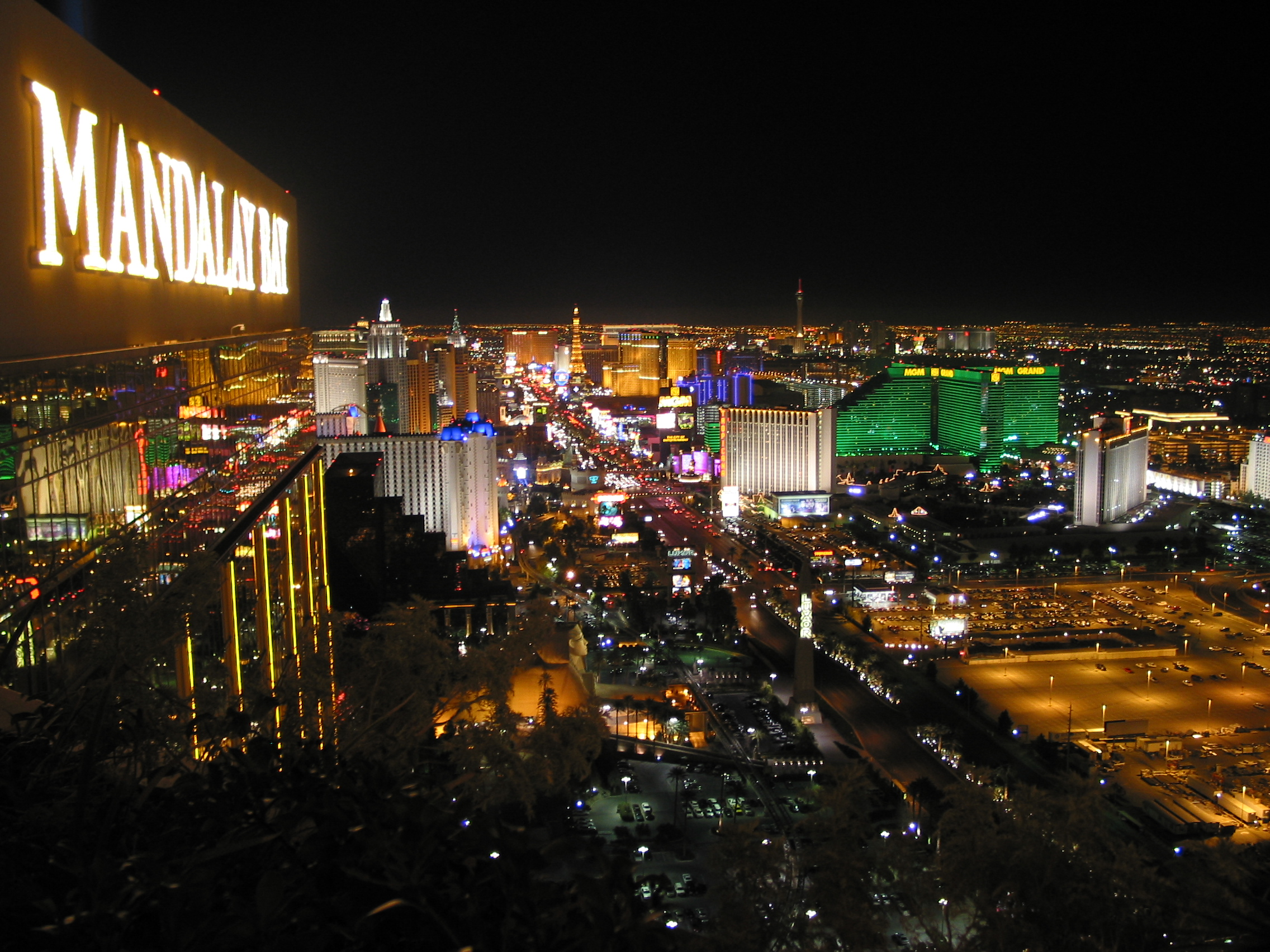
1 / Mandalay Bay Hotel	2 / Route 91 Harvest country music festival grounds
View of the location
Map showing the location of the hotel and the festival grounds
- Location: 36°5′42″N 115°10′18″W; Paradise, Nevada, U.S.
- Date: October 1, 2017; 9 years ago c. 10:05 – 10:15 p.m. (PDT; UTC−07:00)
- Target: Audience of the Route 91 Harvest music festival
- Attack type: Mass shooting; murder–suicide; mass murder
- Weapons: 24 firearms: 14 .223 caliber AR-15-type rifles; Eight .308 caliber AR-10-type rifles; .308 caliber bolt-action rifle; .38 caliber revolver
- Deaths: 61 (including the perpetrator) (Note: Excluding the perpetrator, 58 people died at the scene or in hospitals soon afterwards. A female survivor who died from complications of her injuries on November 15, 2019, was officially declared a fatality in the shooting in August 2020. Another female survivor died of gunshot-wound complications on May 26, 2020, was reported as a fatality in the shooting in September that same year. The Las Vegas police updated the official death toll from 58 to 60 on October 1, 2020, the third anniversary of the shooting.)
- Injuries: ≈ 867 (413+ by gunfire or shrapnel)
- Perpetrator: Stephen Craig Paddock
- Motive: Unknown

On October 1, 2017, a mass shooting occurred when 64-year-old Stephen Paddock opened fire on the crowd attending the Route 91 Harvest music festival on the Las Vegas Strip in Nevada from his 32nd-floor suites in the Mandalay Bay hotel. He fired more than 1,000 rounds, killing 58 people on site and wounding at least 413 others. The ensuing panic brought the total number of injured to about 867. About an hour later, Paddock was found dead in his room from a self-inflicted gunshot wound. Two women wounded by the gunfire died in 2019 and 2020 and were included in the official fatality count of 60, excluding the shooter. The motive for the shooting is not officially determined.

The incident is the deadliest mass shooting in American history. It focused attention on firearms laws in the U.S., particularly with regard to bump stocks, which Paddock used to fire shots in rapid succession, at a rate similar to that of automatic firearms. Bump stocks were banned by the U.S. Justice Department in December 2018, but the ban was overturned by the Supreme Court in 2024.

== Background ==
=== Location ===
The Las Vegas Strip is a stretch of Las Vegas Boulevard immediately south of the city of Las Vegas in Clark County, Nevada. The Strip is known for its concentration of casinos and resort hotels, including the 43-story Mandalay Bay southwest of its intersection with Mandalay Bay Road, in the unincorporated town of Paradise.

Las Vegas Village, a 15-acre (6-hectare) lot used for outdoor performances, was located diagonally across the intersection to the northeast and owned by MGM Resorts International. From 2014 onward, the venue hosted the annual Route 91 Harvest country music festival. The 2017 festival ran from September 29 to October 1, with over 22,000 attendees on the final day. (Note: For the layout of the festival, see "Vegas hospitals swamped with victims after high-rise attack". MSN. Associated Press. October 3, 2017.)

=== Perpetrator ===
Stephen Paddock was a 64-year-old former auditor and real estate businessman who had been living 80 miles (130 km) northeast of Las Vegas in a retirement community in Mesquite, Nevada. He was twice divorced, had a long-term girlfriend, and had no known children. He was a son of Benjamin Paddock, a bank robber who was on the FBI's most-wanted list between 1969 and 1977. Paddock's only recorded interactions with law enforcement were traffic citations.

Paddock was a high-stakes gambler who placed bets at a high enough level to earn valuable comps—free benefits such as rooms and meals. He was a familiar figure to casino hosts in Las Vegas but was not well known among other high-stakes gamblers because he mostly played single-player video poker. He reportedly kept to himself and was a heavy drinker. Paddock had lost a significant amount of his wealth over the previous two years but had paid off all gambling debts before the shooting. In the year before the shooting, Paddock's girlfriend noted a change in his demeanor; he had become increasingly distant, and their relationship was no longer intimate.

== Preparation ==
According to his girlfriend, Paddock repeatedly cased Las Vegas Village from different windows in their room when they stayed at the Mandalay Bay a month before the shooting. Paddock also may have considered attacking other events. He had researched large venues in cities such as Boston since at least May 2017 and had reserved a room overlooking the August 2017 Lollapalooza festival in Chicago, but did not use it. From September 17, Paddock stayed at The Ogden in Downtown Las Vegas, which overlooked the open-air Life is Beautiful festival that ran from September 22 to 24. Paddock's internet search terms from mid-September included "swat weapons", "ballistics chart 308", "SWAT Las Vegas", and "do police use explosives".

Paddock arrived at Mandalay Bay on September 25, 2017, and booked into Room 32-135, a complimentary room on the 32nd floor. Four days later, he also checked into the directly connected Room 32-134. Both suites overlook the site of the concert at Las Vegas Village. (Note: For a diagram of Paddock's hotel suite and connecting room, see: "Why did it take police so long to breach Las Vegas gunman's room? Here's a new timeline". Los Angeles Times. October 4, 2017.) During his stay at Mandalay Bay, Paddock spent much of his time gambling, usually at night. He interacted with employees more than ten times, including twice on the day of the shooting; an MGM Resorts International spokesperson said all the interactions were "normal in nature". Cell phone records show that he also made multiple visits to his home in Mesquite.

With help from hotel bellmen, he brought five suitcases to his room on September 25, seven on the 26th, two on the 28th, six on the 30th, and two on October 1.

On September 30, he placed "do not disturb" signs on the doors of both rooms.

=== Weaponry ===
Twenty-four firearms, a large quantity of ammunition, and numerous high-capacity magazines capable of holding up to 100 rounds each were found in the suite. Fourteen of the firearms were .223-caliber AR-15–style semi-automatic rifles: three manufactured by Colt, two by Daniel Defense, two by FN Herstal, two by LWRC International, two by POF-USA, one with a .223 Wylde chamber by Christensen Arms, one made-to-order by LMT, and one by Noveske. The others were eight .308-caliber AR-10–type rifles, one .308-caliber Ruger American bolt-action rifle, and one .38-caliber Smith & Wesson Model 342 revolver. All 14 of the AR-15 rifles were fitted with vertical forward grips; they also had bump stocks that used recoil to actuate their triggers nine times per second. The AR-10 rifles were equipped with various telescopic sights and mounted on bipods. Paddock was found to have fired a total of 1,058 rounds from 15 of the firearms: 1,049 from twelve AR-15-style rifles, eight from two AR-10-style rifles, and the round used to kill himself from the Smith & Wesson revolver.

During the subsequent investigation, the Bureau of Alcohol, Tobacco, Firearms and Explosives determined that the firearms found in his hotel room, along with more guns found in his homes, had been legally purchased in Nevada, California, Texas, and Utah. In the month preceding the shooting, he tried to buy tracer ammunition, but the gun dealer he approached did not have the item in stock. He bought tracer ammunition from a private seller at a gun show in Phoenix, Arizona. In addition, ammonium nitrate (often used in improvised explosive devices) was found in the trunk of his Chrysler Pacifica SUV, along with 1,600 rounds of ammunition and 50 pounds (23 kg) of Tannerite, a binary explosive used to make explosive targets for gun ranges. Undersheriff Kevin McMahill said that while Paddock had "nefarious intent" with the material, he did not appear to have assembled an explosive device.

== Attack ==
Schematic of the shooting scene. Paddock indiscriminately fired rifle rounds from the 32nd floor of the Mandalay Bay hotel toward the concertgoers at Las Vegas Village.

The mass shooting occurred between 10:05 p.m. and 10:15 p.m. on October 1, 2017, which was the third and final night of the festival. When the shooting began, country music singer Jason Aldean was giving the closing performance.

Shortly before 10:00 p.m., hotel security guard Jesus Campos was sent to the 32nd floor to investigate an open-door alert. When he attempted to open a door to the floor, he found that it would not open. After Campos entered the floor, he discovered an L-shaped bracket screwed into the door and its frame, preventing the door from opening. After reporting the discovery to his dispatch center, he heard what he thought was drilling in Room 32-135 and went to investigate.

About 10:05 p.m., Campos was hit in the right thigh by one of about 35 bullets that Paddock fired through the door of his suite. Campos took cover in the alcove between Rooms 32-122 and 32-124 and immediately informed the hotel by radio and cellphone that he had been shot, though he believed he had been shot with a BB or pellet gun. The wounded Campos then encountered Stephen Schuck, a maintenance worker who had arrived to fix the door that Campos had reported as barricaded. Campos told Schuck to take cover. Schuck contacted hotel dispatchers over his radio, informed them of the ongoing shooting, and told them to call the police. Neither the Las Vegas Metropolitan Police Department nor MGM Resorts International, the Mandalay Bay's owner, have confirmed when information about the initial shooting was relayed to the police.

1	Mandalay Bay hotel
2	Main stage of Route 91 Harvest festival
3	Jet fuel tanks at McCarran International Airport

Paddock used a hammer to break two of the windows in both of his suites. At 10:05 p.m., he began shooting through them. He ultimately fired more than 1,000 rifle rounds about 490 yards (450 m) into the festival audience. (Note: For an infographic of what occurred at the venue during the shooting, see the fourth image of: "Las Vegas Shooting: Chaos at a Concert and a Frantic Search at Mandalay Bay". The New York Times. October 2, 2017..) He started out with a few single gunshots before firing in bursts that usually ranged from 80 rounds to 100 rounds. Many people in the crowd initially mistook the gunfire for fireworks. During the shooting, a security fence hindered concertgoers from fleeing the 15-acre (6-hectare) concrete lot. The gunfire continued, with some momentary pauses, for ten minutes, ending by 10:15 p.m. During these pauses (during reload and while the assailant was confronting Campos), most concertgoers down below were able to flee the venue.

In addition to shooting at the concertgoers, Paddock fired eight bullets at a large jet fuel tank at McCarran International Airport 2,000 feet (600 m) away. Two of those bullets struck the exterior of the tank, with one bullet penetrating the tank. The fuel did not explode because jet fuel is mostly kerosene, which is unlikely to ignite when struck by a bullet.

During the shooting, police officers were initially confused whether the shots were coming from the Mandalay Bay, the nearby Luxor hotel, or the festival grounds. There were also multiple reports of additional shooters at other hotels on the Strip. Officers eventually spotted multiple muzzle flashes from the middle of the northern side of Mandalay Bay and responded to the hotel. At 10:12 p.m., two officers on the 31st floor reported the sounds of gunfire on the floor above them. When officers arrived on the 32nd floor at 10:17 p.m. and encountered Campos a minute later, he directed them to Paddock's room and helped others evacuate. Campos was then directed to seek medical attention for himself.

Between 10:26 p.m. and 10:30 p.m., eight additional officers arrived at the 32nd floor; some of those officers manually breached the door Paddock had screwed shut with the bracket. The gunfire had ceased, and the police moved systematically down the hallway, searching and clearing each room, using a master key that was provided by Campos. At 10:55 p.m., the officers finished evacuating guests. At 11:20 p.m., over an hour after the initial officers arrived on the 32nd floor, police breached Room 32-135 with explosives. Paddock was found dead on the floor from a self-inflicted gunshot wound to the mouth. Police then breached Room 32-134; while entering the hotel suite, an officer accidentally fired a three-round burst from his weapon, but the bullets did not hit anyone. At 11:27 p.m., officers announced over the police radio that a suspect was down.

=== Immediate response ===
McCarran Airport, adjacent to the shooting site, was shut down for several hours. About 300 people entered the airport grounds as they fled from the shooting. This prompted officials to shut down all four runways. More than 25 flights were rerouted to ensure that no aircraft would be hit by gunfire, while other flights were canceled before airfield operations resumed at 12:40 a.m. on October 2.

Much of Las Vegas Boulevard was closed while police SWAT teams combed the venue and neighboring businesses. About 2:45 p.m. PDT on October 2, a state of emergency was declared in Clark County. Early on October 2, Sheriff Lombardo identified the suspect as Stephen Paddock.

== Victims ==
=== Dead ===
There were 61 deaths including Paddock. The immediate dead comprised 58 victims—36 women and 22 men—all of whom died from gunshot wounds. The oldest was 67; the youngest, 20. Thirty-four were from California; six from Nevada; four from Canada; two each from Alaska and Utah; and one each from Arizona, Colorado, Iowa, Minnesota, Massachusetts, New Mexico, Pennsylvania, Tennessee, Washington, West Virginia, and Wisconsin. Thirty-one of the victims were pronounced dead at the scene; twenty-seven died from their wounds at hospitals, the last on October 3, two days after the shooting. Among these victims were an employee of the Las Vegas police department and an employee of the Manhattan Beach police department, both of whom were off-duty at the festival. Paddock's suicide was the only death at the Mandalay Bay Hotel.

A 57-year-old woman from California, who had been paralyzed in the shooting, died more than two years later on November 15, 2019. On August 24, 2020, the San Bernardino County medical examiner officially attributed her death to the shooting, though the Las Vegas Metropolitan Police Department (LVMPD) declined at the time to include her in the official death toll. The LVMPD also initially declined to include a 49-year-old Nevada woman who died from complications of a leg wound on May 26, 2020. The department revised its decision, however, and on October 1, 2020, included both women in the count. In 2023, a probate case determined that the shares of Paddock's estate would be distributed among the families of 61 victims, though the attorney who handled the case declined to disclose the identity of the 61st person or how they died. The Las Vegas Review-Journal reported that the 61st person was a survivor who committed suicide after the shooting.

The incident is the deadliest mass shooting committed by an individual in the United States, exceeding the death toll of the 2016 Pulse nightclub shooting, in which 49 people were killed.

=== Injured ===
About 867 people were injured, at least 413 of them with gunshot wounds or shrapnel injuries. Many victims were transported to area hospitals, including University Medical Center of Southern Nevada, Sunrise Hospital & Medical Center, and at least one of the six hospitals of Valley Health System. Sunrise Hospital treated the largest portion of the wounded: 199 patients, 150 of whom arrived within about 40 minutes. University Medical Center treated 104 patients. Six victims sought medical treatment in Southern California: UC Irvine Medical Center treated four; Loma Linda University Medical Center, two. Many victims of the shooting required blood transfusions, which totaled 499 components in the first 24 hours of treatment. This blood was rapidly replaced by local and national blood banks.

Las Vegas has a Level I trauma center: University Medical Center, but two factors limited the number of patients treated there. First, most patients were transported by private vehicles, and the most direct route from the shooting location, Interstate 15, was closed to the public. Second, an hour after the shooting, emergency services were erroneously told that UMC was full. This confusion persisted for several hours and led to most patients being transported to Sunrise, a Level II trauma center.

On the morning after the shooting, lines to donate blood in Las Vegas stretched for blocks, and wait times were as much as six hours or more. In Las Vegas alone, 800 units of blood were donated to the local blood bank in the days after the shooting; the American Red Cross reported a 53% increase in blood donation in the two days after the shooting. It was later reported that over 15% of the blood donated in Las Vegas after the shooting went unused, prompting questions about the benefit of widespread calls for blood donation after mass shootings. Millions of dollars have also been raised to help victims and their families.

== Investigations ==
=== Early reports ===
Officials from the FBI and the ATF responded to assist in the investigation. According to authorities with the Clark County Commission, the name "1 October" was declared the official title for investigations into the mass shooting.

Investigators found hidden surveillance cameras that were placed inside and outside the hotel room, presumably so Paddock could monitor the arrival of others. The cameras were not in record mode. Police said a handwritten note found in the room indicated Paddock had been calculating the distance, wind, and trajectory from his 32nd floor hotel suite to the concertgoers he was targeting on the festival lot.

At a press conference on October 4, Clark County Sheriff Joe Lombardo stated there was evidence—which he declined to discuss—that Paddock intended to escape the scene, and that he may have had assistance from an accomplice. Investigators searched Paddock's room and found a bulletproof vest and breathing apparatus, neither of which was used by Paddock.

There have been several changes in the official account and timeline of Paddock's shooting of hotel security guard Campos. Police officials described these adjustments as "minute changes" that are common in complex investigations.

In their first statement about the incident, police officials inaccurately reported that Campos arrived on the scene after Paddock began firing into the crowd. In a second statement, police officials reported, again inaccurately, that Campos was shot six minutes before Paddock began firing into the crowd. That report had been based on a 9:59 p.m. notation in a hotel security log, which in a third statement was determined to have been the time when Campos encountered the barricaded door.

Sheriff Lombardo dismissed allegations that the changing timeline was the result of some kind of conspiracy between the police department, the FBI, and MGM Resorts International, saying, "Nobody is attempting to hide anything in reference to this investigation. The dynamics and the size of this investigation requires us to go through voluminous amounts of information in order to draw an accurate picture."

=== Preliminary investigation ===
The Las Vegas Metropolitan Police Department released a preliminary report on the event on January 18, 2018.

Police speculate that Paddock acted alone and have not determined his motive. No links have been identified to any hate groups, terrorist groups, or ideologies, and he did not record a reason for his actions.

On February 2, 2018, Douglas Haig, an unlicensed ammunition seller, was initially charged in a Nevada federal court with "conspiracy to manufacture and sell armor piercing ammunition without a license" after his fingerprints were discovered on unfired armor-piercing ammunition inside Paddock's suite. He pleaded guilty to illegally manufacturing ammunition, and was sentenced in June 2020 to thirteen months in prison.

=== Final investigative report ===
On August 3, 2018, Clark County Sheriff Joe Lombardo held a press conference on the release of the LVMPD Criminal Investigative Report of the October 1 Mass Casualty Shooting. He said the 10-month investigation had revealed no evidence of conspiracy or a second gunman, and that Paddock's motive had not been definitely determined. Lombardo said, "What we have been able to answer are the questions of who, what, when, where, and how ... what we have not been able to definitively answer is why Stephen Paddock committed this act." A report published by the FBI's Behavioral Analysis Unit in January 2019 said that "there was no single or clear motivating factor" for the shooting.

== Aftermath ==
=== Misinformation, fake news, and conspiracy theories ===
After the shooting, misinformation and fake news about the shooter's identity and motive went viral on social media:

- A 4chan /pol/ thread, which misidentified the shooter and described him as a registered Democrat, was briefly featured in the "Top Stories" section of a Google Search for the alleged shooter's name. This was further circulated by a number of websites, including being shared briefly on The Gateway Pundit.
- The fake news website Your News Wire spread false information about a second gunman purportedly shooting from the fourth floor of the hotel.
- Two of Facebook's top trending pages were items from Sputnik, a Russian government news agency. These included one story that falsely claimed the FBI had linked the shooter to a terrorist group. The stories were later removed from Sputnik with an apology.
- Stories linking the shooter to the Antifa movement have also been discredited.
- The terrorist group Islamic State (IS) claimed that Paddock was its "soldier", by the nom de guerre Abu Abdul Barr al-Amriki, who had answered Abu Bakr al-Baghdadi's call to attack coalition countries' citizens. IS provided no evidence for this, had previously released multiple false claims of responsibility for other incidents, and no such link was discovered by the FBI.

Google and Facebook were criticized for displaying such false news stories in some of their search results. Alexis Madrigal of The Atlantic accused the two technology companies of failing in their responsibility to keep these from reaching the public. Facebook later said its algorithms were designed to detect and remove false stories, but failed to work adequately in this instance.

Survivors of the shooting have been accused of being crisis actors, and some have received death threats on social media. Conspiracy theorists have claimed that there were multiple shooters and that details of the massacre are being covered up for the sake of promoting gun control laws. After some media outlets reported that YouTube search results for information about the shooting returned links to conspiracy videos, YouTube said it had tweaked its search algorithm to promote news sources which it considered more authoritative. Political scientist Joseph Uscinski suggested the removal of this content ironically fuels conspiracy theories by making a cover-up seem evident.

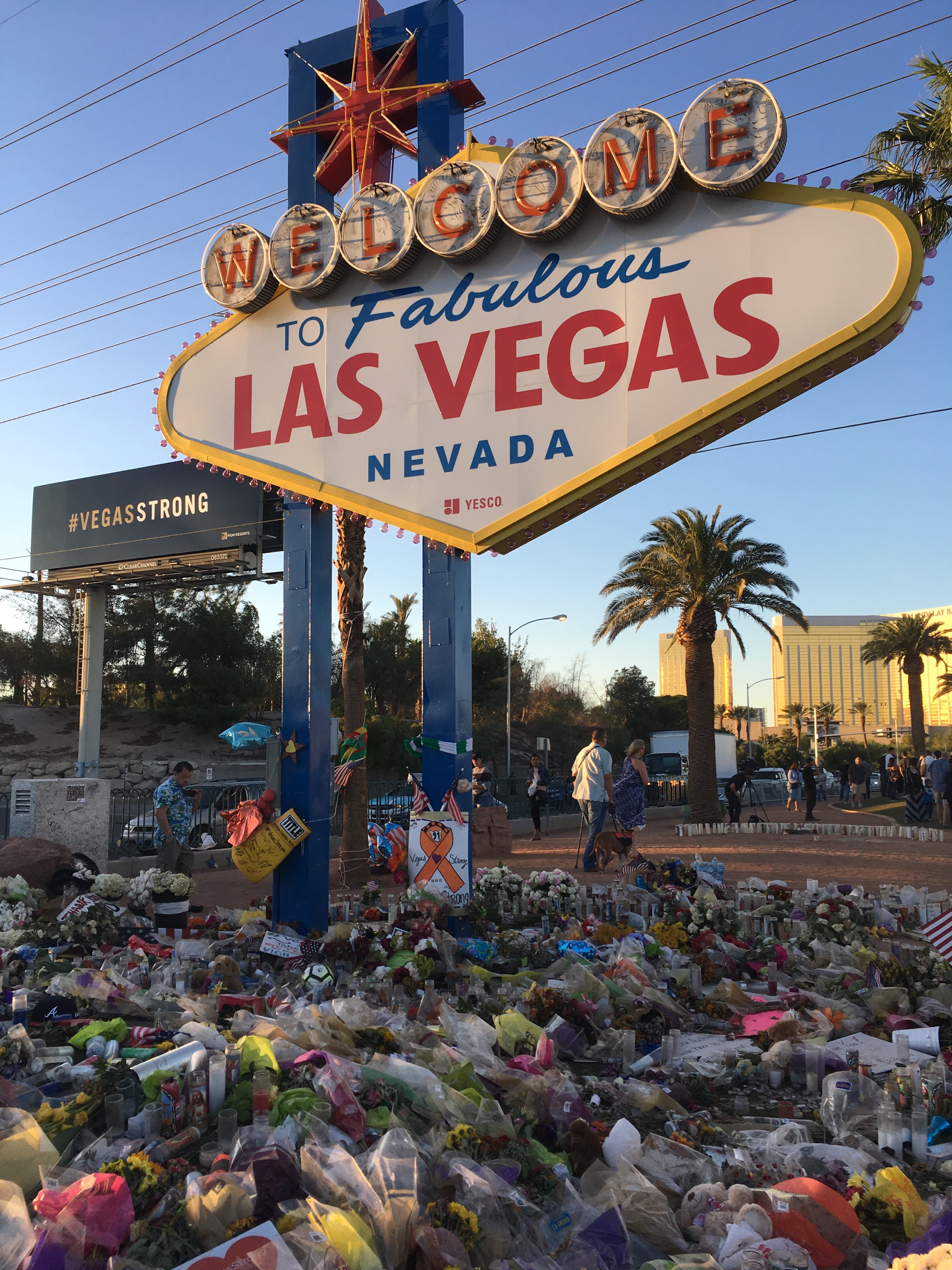
The Welcome to Fabulous Las Vegas sign adorned with flowers on October 9, 2017, a week after the shooting

=== Responses ===
Nevada Governor Brian Sandoval called the shooting "a tragic and heinous act of violence that has shaken the Nevada family". Jason Aldean, who was singing when the shooting started, posted his condolences on Instagram and noted all of those working with him at the show had survived the attack.

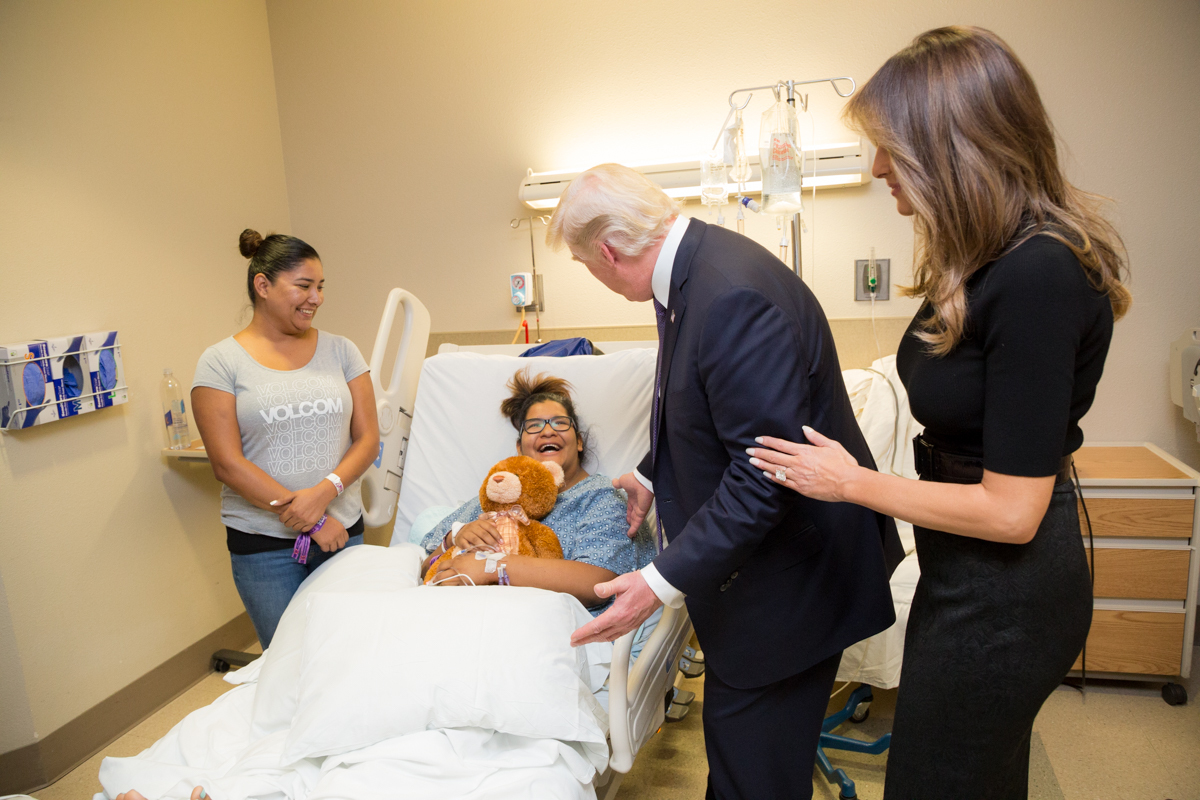
President Trump and First Lady Melania visiting a hospitalized victim

At a press conference, U.S. President Donald Trump described Paddock as "a very very sick individual", and "a demented man, [with] a lot of problems" and described the event as an "act of pure evil". He added, "the police department has done such an incredible job, and we'll be talking about gun laws as time goes by". A White House official talking points memo, distributed to Trump allies, opposed tightening gun control since "new laws won't stop a mad man", but "will curtail the freedoms of law abiding citizens". On October 2, Trump issued a proclamation to honor the victims and their families. On October 4, Trump visited the shooting victims and first responders.

A unity prayer walk and ceremony was held in Las Vegas on October 7 in honor of the dead. Speakers at the ceremony included Vice President Mike Pence and Las Vegas Mayor Carolyn Goodman. On the evening of October 15, thousands participated in a commemorative three-mile (5 km) walk between Circus Circus and Mandalay Bay.

The annual Rock 'n' Roll Las Vegas Marathon took place on November 12 and was the largest event to be held in the city since the shooting. The event received a massive amount of security, which included counter-sniper surveillance posts; 350 police officers; and a number of barriers composed of dump trucks, buses, and other large vehicles.

The expansion Vegas Golden Knights of the NHL held a tribute to the victims and honored response personnel before their inaugural home game on October 10. Later during the season, the number 58 became the first number in team history to be retired, chosen for the 58 people who died immediately or within days of the shooting.

The Mandalay Bay Resort renumbered its floors, skipping floor 32. Rooms 32-135 and 32-134, the rooms rented out by Paddock, were sealed off and made inaccessible to guests.

The future of the Las Vegas Village remained undetermined until September 2019. MGM Resorts International had announced that they intended to create a community center, which would host sporting events. In 2021, MGM Resorts donated 2 acres of the land for a permanent memorial to the victims and survivors and sold the remaining 13 acres to Three Affiliated Tribes for an undisclosed sum in 2022.

In March 2019, Las Vegas police officer Cordell Hendrex, who did not immediately respond to the gunfire but had remained in the floor below Paddock, was fired for his inaction. He was reinstated a year later after an arbitrator's ruling.

=== Gun control discussion ===
The shooting prompted support in Congress for assault weapons legislation that would ban bump stocks. Many Congressional Democrats and some Republicans expressed support. House leaders said the issue of bump stock regulation should be decided by the Bureau of Alcohol, Tobacco, and Firearms, which originally approved bump stocks. The National Rifle Association (NRA) came out in favor of administrative bump stock regulations. Firearms retailers reported increased consumer interest in bump stocks.

On November 6, 2017, Massachusetts became the first state to ban the sale, possession, or use of the devices. In December 2018, Acting United States Attorney General Matthew Whitaker signed a regulation banning bump stocks in the U.S., effective March 2019. The regulation banned new sales and required current owners to surrender or destroy existing bump stocks.

Eighteen Democratic U.S. Senators introduced a bill, the Keep Americans Safe Act, which would ban gun magazines that hold more than ten rounds of ammunition. Stock prices of firearms manufacturers rose the day after the shooting, as has happened after similar incidents. Investors expected gun sales to increase over concerns that such an event could lead to more stringent gun-control legislation, and possibly due to a rush of customers wishing to defend themselves against future attacks, but firearm sales did not increase after the shooting.

=== Legal proceedings ===
In November 2017, a lawsuit was filed on behalf of 450 of the victims of the shooting, which claimed that the Mandalay Bay Hotel had shown negligence by allowing Paddock to bring a large amount of weaponry into the building. In July 2018, MGM Resorts International countersued hundreds of victims, claiming that it had "no liability of any kind" for the attack, under a 2002 federal law passed in the wake of the September 11 attacks. On October 3, 2019, MGM Resorts reached a settlement of $800 million with the victims of the shooting, which was approved by a judge on September 30, 2020.

In 2019, a Texan gun store owner, backed by the NRA, appealed the national ban on bump stocks enacted the same year by classifying rifles with bump stocks as machine guns. The case was finally decided in his favor on 14 June 2024 by a majority opinion from the U.S. Supreme Court that bump stocks should not be considered as machine guns in the meaning of the law. Justice Samuel Alito (who joined the majority) said in a separate statement that the Congress was free to counteract this decision by amending the applicable law. In a dissenting opinion, three judges stated that semi-automatic guns with bump stocks should be considered as machine guns, since multiple bullets would be released by one pull of the trigger, without manual reloading.

=== Thousand Oaks shooting ===
Some people who were at the scene of the Las Vegas shooting when it occurred were also present during a November 2018 mass shooting at the Borderline Bar and Grill in Thousand Oaks, California, which left thirteen dead, including the gunman. One person said the number of Las Vegas survivors at the bar may have been as high as 60. It was confirmed that Telemachus Orfanos, a survivor of the Las Vegas shooting had died in the Thousand Oaks shooting.

=== Memorial ===
In 2019, the 1 October Memorial Committee (1OMC) was formed to honor the victims of the shooting by commemorating them in a memorial. 1OMC's jury has looked over and reviewed all the memorial submissions and selected five finalists which include Aaron Neubert Architects and studioSTIGSGAARD, JCJ Architecture; OLIN, Paul Murdoch Architects, and SWA.

== Bravery award recipients ==
=== Civilian ===
Martin Heffernan, Assistant Scoutmaster, was honored by Boy Scouts of America for demonstrating unusual heroism and extraordinary skill in saving or attempting to save a life at extreme risk to self with the Honor Award with Crossed Palms.

Brittany Speer, an EMT at UCLA, received a Medal of Courage from the University of California Police Department (UCPD) for her bravery in setting up a triage area and treating victims while the shooter was still active. She is the only civilian in medical services to receive this honor.

=== Military ===
Trooper Ross Woodward, a British soldier from the 1st The Queen's Dragoon Guards, who was off-duty at a nearby hotel when the shooting began, was awarded the Queen's Commendation for Bravery for his actions during the event. His citation stated that "he consciously, deliberately and repeatedly advanced towards danger, moving people to safety and treating casualties".

Matthew Cobos, a U.S. Army soldier, received the 2018 Single Act of Heroism Award from the Congressional Medal of Honor Society for shielding and providing life-saving medical treatment to injured concert-goers. An image of Cobos protecting a young woman, by photographer David Becker, went viral and he was later identified by the Army.

Sgt. Austin Cox and Sgt. Michael Vura, helicopter mechanics with the U.S. Marines at Camp Pendleton, received the Navy and Marine Corps Medal, the highest noncombat decoration awarded for heroism by the Department of the Navy, for braving gunfire to save victims and get them out of the line of fire.

Petty Officer First Class Brian Mazi, with the U.S. Navy, who was attending the event with his wife, was awarded the Navy and Marine Corps Medal for his actions.

Petty Officer Second Class Traci Huddleston of the United States Coast Guard received the Coast Guard Medal for her actions in response to the shooting. Huddleston was awarded for "demonstrat[ing] remarkable initiative, exceptional fortitude, and daring in spite of imminent personal danger".

Sgt. Chasen Brown with the Utah Army National Guard was awarded the Medal of Valor for saving at least half a dozen other concert-goers. For 60–90 minutes after the shooting stopped, he continued to assess and aid casualties.

=== Police ===
Detective Conor O'Donnell of the Rhode Island State Police, who had attended the event with his girlfriend, was awarded a service ribbon.

The San Diego Police Department honored nine officers and two detectives from their department who were vacationing separately in Las Vegas. Detective Michael Vo and Officers Thomas McGrath, Mark Williams, Max Verduzco and Richard Barton received the Medal of Valor for their actions in treating the wounded, creating escape routes, and shielding concert-goers. McGrath was also presented the Lifesaving Medal by Jonathan Smith, a civilian who survived a gunshot wound to the neck due to McGrath's quick actions. Detective Scott Gosnell and Officers Caitlin Milligan, Eric Hansen, Bryan Johnson, William Hernandez Jr. and Braden Wilson received the department's "Exceptional Performance Citation" for assisting concert-goers and helping them escape the venue.

== See also ==
- Gun violence in the United States
- Gun law in the United States
- Gun politics in the United States
- Gun laws in Nevada
- Mass shootings in the United States
- List of disasters in the United States by death toll
