= John H. Francis Polytechnic High School =

Public high school in California, United States

Location
- 12431 Roscoe Boulevard; Sun Valley, (Los Angeles County), California 91352; United States; 34.2228°N 118.4067°W

Information
- School type: Public, comprehensive high school
- Motto: Victory with Honor
- Established: 1897; 129 years ago
- Status: 🟩 Opened
- School district: Los Angeles Unified School District
- NCES District ID: 062271003020
- Principal: Walter Rich
- Teaching staff: 122.83 (2018–19)
- Grades: 9–12
- Student to teacher ratio: 21.48 (2018–19)
- Colors: Blue; Gold
- Athletics conference: East Valley League; CIF Los Angeles City Section
- Mascot: Parrot
- Newspaper: The Poly Optimist
- Yearbook: The Polytechnic Student
- Website: www.polyhigh.org

John H. Francis Polytechnic High School is a secondary school located in the Sun Valley neighborhood of Los Angeles, California, United States. It serves grades 9 through 12 and is a part of the Los Angeles Unified School District. Despite its name, Polytechnic is a comprehensive high school.

== History ==
Polytechnic High School opened in 1897 as a "commercial branch" of the only high school at that time in the city, Los Angeles High School. As such, Polytechnic would be the third oldest high school in the city, after Abraham Lincoln High School in Lincoln Heights, (founded in 1878), and the fourth oldest in the LAUSD, after San Fernando High School., which was founded in 1896. The school's original campus was located in downtown Los Angeles on South Beaudry Avenue, the present location of the Los Angeles Unified School District (LAUSD) Board of Education headquarters.

Old, neoclassical campus of Metropolitan Polytechnic High near LA's historic core, 1905

In 1905, Metropolitan Polytechnic moved to the south side of Washington Boulevard at the corner of Flower Street in downtown Los Angeles, across Washington from old St. Vincent's College. Poly was the first school to offer studies in multiple class subjects, which is now modeled by many high schools, as "periods." In 1935, its name was changed to "John H. Francis Polytechnic" to honor the founding principal.

In February 1957, Polytechnic moved to its present site in the San Fernando Valley and opened its doors to new students for the then fast growing suburb. Since Poly's relocation, the former site has been the campus of Los Angeles Trade–Technical College. The school mascot is a parrot named Joe Parrot, and he now has a female companion named Josie.

It was in the Los Angeles City High School District until 1961, when it merged into LAUSD.

In 2006, the establishment of Arleta High School and Panorama High School relieved much of the overcrowding at Polytechnic. The 2009 opening of Sun Valley High School additionally relieved overcrowding.

Poly's basketball gym is named for NBA Hall-of-Famer Gail Goodrich, a Poly alumnus. The Parrots have had a longtime rivalry with both Van Nuys High School and North Hollywood High School.

== Notable alumni ==
- Carl David Anderson, recipient of the 1936 Nobel Prize in Physics
- Richard Bishop (1930), artistic gymnast
- Tom Bradley (1937), 38th Mayor of Los Angeles (1973–1993)
- Helen Gurley Brown (1939), author, publisher, and businesswoman; founded Cosmopolitan magazine and was its editor in chief 1965–1997
- Bessie Bruington Burke (1910), first Black principal in Los Angeles Public Schools
- Ike Danning, Major League Baseball player
- Hideo Date, painter
- Bill Davila: first Mexican-American to preside over a supermarket chain
- Marcellite Garner (1928), voice actress of Minnie Mouse
- D. J. Gay (2007), basketball player
- J. Paul Getty, international petroleum businessman, "World's Richest Man".
- Gail Goodrich (1961), basketball player in the NBA, attended UCLA
- Alice Rogers Hager (1894–1969), president, Women's National Press Club
- Joseph Hampel, radio host and deejay for music group LMFAO
- Phyllis Maude Haver, Silent film actress active 1915–1930
- Michael Horse (1968; born Michael Heinrich), actor
- William Hung (2001), American Idol singer
- Fay M. Jackson (1920), African-American journalist and publicist
- George A. Kasem (1938), Democratic US Representative for California's 25th congressional district (1959–1961)
- Bob Kuwahara (1921), animator
- Joseph Thomas McGucken, Archbishop of San Francisco from 1962 to 1977
- Tanya Neiman (1966), lawyer in San Francisco
- John W. Olmsted (1915), Professor Emeritus at University of California, Riverside
- Stephen Paddock (1971), perpetrator of the 2017 Las Vegas shooting
- Greg Palast (left for college in 1969), investigative journalist
- Bruce Pardo (1981), perpetrator of the 2008 Covina massacre
- Milton Quon (1932), animator, artist and actor
- Stanley Mark Rifkin, convicted criminal (bank theft via wire transfer)
- Peter Senge (1965), author, scientist, and director of the Center for Organizational Learning at MIT
- Al Sparlis (1939), inductee of the College Football Hall of Fame and highly decorated military pilot
- Vaino Spencer (1938), judge
- Herbert R. Temple Jr. (1947), Lieutenant General and Chief of the National Guard Bureau, 1986–1990
- Sloppy Thurston, pitcher in Major League Baseball
- Layne Tom Jr., architect and American actor
- Danny Trejo, actor
- Paul R. Williams, architect

== Notable faculty ==
- Arthur E. Briggs: Los Angeles City Council member, 1939–1941, taught law at night
- Ralph Jesson: football coach at Polytechnic (1924–1928)

== Notable administrators ==
- James B. Taylor, in 1962 became first Black principal of a predominantly White high school in Los Angeles while at Poly
