= Alice Rogers Hager =

American writer (1894–1969)

- Hager in 1945
- Born: Alice M. Rogers; August 3, 1894; Peoria, Illinois, U.S.
- Died: December 5, 1969 (aged 75); Manassas, Virginia, U.S.
- Education: Leland Stanford Jr. University; University of California, Berkeley
- Employers: Special agent, Bureau of Labor Statistics; Chief, Public Information, Civil Aeronautics Board
- Organization(s): President, Women's National Press Club
- Spouse: John Manfred Hager (m. 1916)
- Children: 2
- Awards: China Burma India theater ribbon, U.S. War Department

Alice Rogers Hager (1894–1969) was an American writer, journalist, and traveler. During World War I, she served as a Special agent to the Bureau of Labor Statistics. During World War II, she served as Chief of Public Information of the Civil Aeronautics Board. Hager was also President of the Women's National Press Club.

== Early life and education ==
Alice M. Rogers was born in Peoria, Illinois, on August 3, 1894. Her parents were Harry James and Caroline (Sammis) Rogers.

She received her education at Polytechnic High School (Los Angeles, California); Leland Stanford Jr. University (A.B. degree, 1915); and University of California, Berkeley (1917).

== Career ==
Hager wrote newspaper feature articles and general magazine articles and poems, which were published in the U.S., Japan, and France. She served as an aviation reporter for The New York Times . he reported on aviation news for the North American Newspaper Syndicate.

During World War I, she served as a Special agent to the Bureau of Labor Statistics (1918–19, war service); American Red Cross Canteen Service, Hempstead, New York, 1918; New York YMCA; Nurses Committee (National YWCA headquarters), 1919.

Hager lived in Tokyo, Japan, 1919–20. While she lived there, she was a member of the Board Amateur Dramatic Club, Board Women's Club, and the Asiatic Society of Japan. She also served as the chair of one of the pageants for International Sunday School convention. Leaving Japan, she continued her trip around the world via the Suez Canal, spending nearly a year in northern Europe and Scandinavia.

She was the author and director of the Cherry Blossom festival pageant which occurred in the White House gardens, on Easter Sunday, in 1927. Having attended two Imperial garden parties when she and her husband were previously in Japan, she was thus able to make the Cherry Blossom Festival in Washington, D.C. a replica of the Japanese event.

During World War II, Hager reported on the air war in China, Burma, and India (CBI). Hager was the Chief of Public Information on the Civil Aeronautics Board (1942). She also served on the Board of Patrons of "Ligue du Nord Contre la Tuberculose," with headquarters at the Pasteur Institute of Lille, France.

She was a member of the Capt. Wendell Wolfe Chapter, Daughters of the American Revolution (DAR); National League of American Pen Women (1925–26, chair, publicity, Washington, D.C.); League of Women Voters (1926–27, corresponding secretary, Washington, D.C.); and Delta Delta Delta (national college sorority).

== Personal life ==
On August 3, 1916, she married John Manfred Hager, both of them having graduated from Stanford the year before. They had two daughters, Carolyn Anne (b. 1921), and Helen Dinwiddie (b. 1923).

Hager was a resident of Alhambra, California before removing to Washington, D.C. in April 1925.

In religion, she was a member of the Congregational Church.

== Death and legacy ==
She died in Manassas, Virginia, December 5, 1969.

The Alice Rogers Hager Papers are held at Syracuse University.

== Awards and honors ==
- China Burma India theater ribbon, U.S. War Department

== Selected works ==
=== Articles ===
- "Women Who Work for "Uncle Sam". Brief Reviews of Long Reports No. 1.", The Woman's Citizen, January 1927, vol. 11, p. 38 (text)
- "I Flew for a Week", Flying Magazine, January 1939, p. 27 (text)

=== Poems ===
- "Beside the Peach Blossom Fountain", Asia, October 1918, vol. 18, p. 819 (text)
- "Roma Eversa", Art and Archaeology, December 1919, vol. 8, no. 6, p. 347 (text)
- "Shadows", The Lyric West, 1921 vol. 1, p. 17 (text)
