= Bessie Burke =

American teacher and principal (1891–1968)

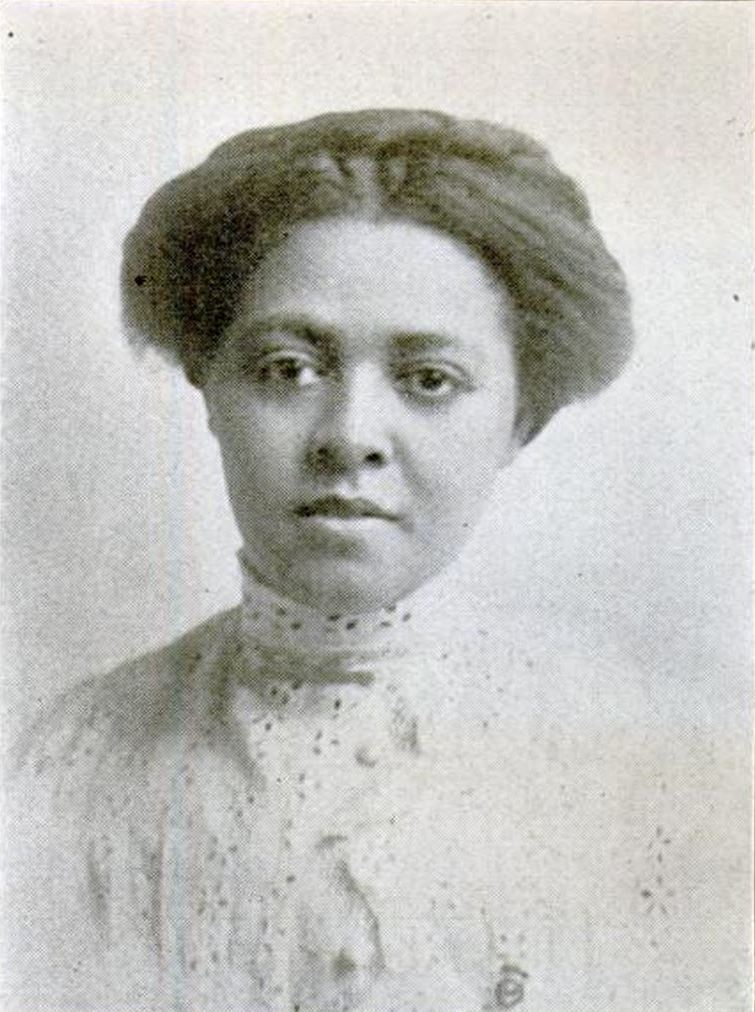
Bessie Burke, c. 1912

Bessie Bruington Burke (March 19, 1891 – 1968) was the first African American teacher and principal hired in the Los Angeles public school system.

In 1887, Burke's parents left their farms and teaching jobs in Kansas via a covered wagon. They settled in what is now North Hollywood. Burke attended Berendo Elementary School; Polytechnic High School; and the Los Angeles State Normal School (LANS), which is now a part of the University of California, Los Angeles. Burke graduated seventh in a class of 800 from LANS. By 1911, Burke had received her teaching credentials and became the first black teacher in the Los Angeles Public School System.

Burke began teaching at Holmes Elementary School and became the first black principal in L.A. in 1918. In 1938, she became a principal at Nevin Avenue School, making her the first black principal to head a racially integrated school.

Burke served in a number of civic organizations including the YWCA, Native California club, the Women's Political Study Club, and the NAACP. Burke was also a member of the Delta Sigma Theta sorority. She retired from the Los Angeles Board of Education in 1955.
