= Rich Higgins =

American analyst (1974–2022)

Richard Higgins (September 18, 1974 – February 23, 2022) was an American counter-terrorism analyst who served as the Director for Strategic Planning of the National Security Council in the Trump administration in 2017. He was removed by National Security Adviser H.R. McMaster after warning in a memo of a deep state plot to remove the president.

== Career ==
Higgins earned a Bachelor of Science in mechanical engineering from Tufts University. After college, he served as a specialist in an Explosive Ordnance Disposal unit in the United States Army. After serving in the army, he went on to work for the United States Department of Defense. As a civilian working for the Department of Defense, he attended the National Defense University (NDU), studying security strategy and counter-terrorism and received a master's degree. He eventually became the National Defense University's first civilian chair. Higgins later served as the Vice President of Unconstrained Analytics.

== Trump administration ==
Some months after being appointed to serve in the National Security Council by National Security Advisor Michael Flynn in early 2017, Higgins wrote a seven-page memo titled "POTUS and Political Warfare" which claimed that a cabal of deep state actors were conspiring against Trump, which included the mainstream media, academia, global corporatists and bankers, the Democratic Party leadership, the Republican Party leadership, and Islamists. Trump was reportedly "furious" after learning of Higgins' forced departure by Flynn's replacement, H.R. McMaster.

In 2018, Higgins and retired CIA officer Brad Johnson, backed by about a dozen intelligence and special operations community members, published a conspiracy theory that the Islamic State (IS) and antifa were involved in the 2017 Las Vegas shooting.

Higgins co-authored the book Re-Remembering the Mis-Remembered Left: The Left's Strategy and Tactics To Transform America with Stephen Coughlin in 2019.

In 2020, the White House reportedly attempted to push the Department of Defense to hire Higgins under its nominee for the Under Secretary of Defense for Policy at the Pentagon, Anthony Tata.

Higgins died on February 23, 2022. He left behind his wife and four children.

== Bibliography ==
- Higgins, Rich (2020). The Memo: Twenty Years Inside the Deep State Fighting for America First. Calamo. ISBN 978-0999705933.
