= Ralph Jesson =

American football coach and official (1893–1985)

Biographical details
- Born: July 22, 1893; Michigan, U.S.
- Died: January 11, 1985 (aged 91); Los Angeles, California, U.S.

Playing career
- 1910s: Pomona

Coaching career (HC unless noted)
- 1920: Loyola (CA)
- 1924–1928: John H. Francis Polytechnic HS (CA)

Head coaching record
- Overall: 0–2–1 (college football)

Ralph William Jesson (July 22, 1893 – January 11, 1985) was an American college football coach. He served as the head coach at Loyola College of Los Angeles—now known as Loyola Marymount University—in 1920.

== Biography ==
Jesson attended Pomona College, where he played on the football team in 1915. He served as the freshman coach at Occidental College.

In 1920, Jesson served as head coach for Loyola, where he compiled a 0–2–1 record. From 1924 to 1928, he coached the football team at Polytechnic High School in Los Angeles, California. From 1930 to 1934, he coached the school's basketball team. In the 1930s, he also worked as a football official in the Pacific Coast Conference.

Jesson and his wife, Vivian Rich, the silent film actress, lived in Los Angeles, California. They had three children, the eldest of whom was Ralph William Jr.

== Head coaching record ==
| Year | Team | Overall | Conference | Standing | Bowl/playoffs |
|---|---|---|---|---|---|
Loyola Lions (Independent) (1920)
| 1920 | Loyola | 0–2–1 | | | |
| Loyola: | | 0–2–1 | | | |
| Total: | | 0–2–1 | | | |
