= Benjamin Hoskins Paddock =

American bank robber and con man (1926–1998)

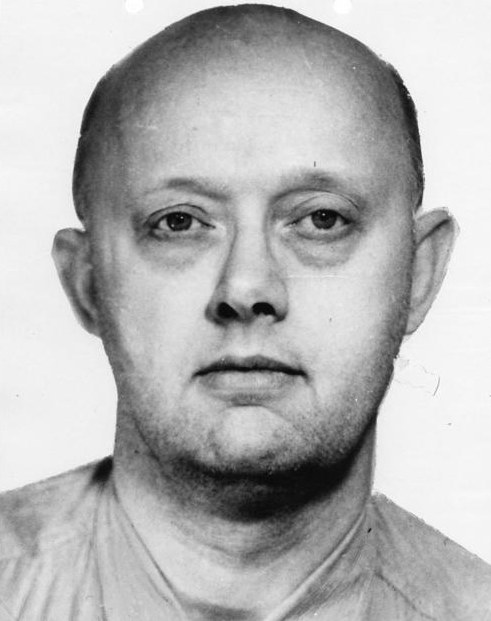
- Paddock c. 1969
- Born: Benjamin Hoskins Paddock Jr. November 1, 1926; Sheboygan, Wisconsin, U.S.
- Died: January 18, 1998 (aged 71); Arlington, Texas, U.S.
- Resting place: Fort Gibson National Cemetery, Oklahoma, U.S.
- Other name: Bruce Werner Ericksen
- Spouse: Dolores Irene Hudson (m. 1952)
- Children: 4, including Stephen

Benjamin Hoskins Paddock Jr. (November 1, 1926 – January 18, 1998) was an American bank robber and con man who was on the FBI Ten Most Wanted Fugitives list from 1969 to 1977. He was also the father of mass murderer Stephen Paddock, the perpetrator of the 2017 Las Vegas shooting.

== Early life ==
Paddock was born at St. Nicholas Hospital in Sheboygan, Wisconsin, on November 1, 1926, (Note: Various years are given for his birth date. His gravestone gives 1920. His Social Security application uses "1 November 1925" and his Veterans Affairs record uses "1 November 1926". The 1930 census lists him as 3 years old on April 19, 1930. If he was born in 1926 he would have been 3 years, 5 months, 18 days old on April 19, 1930.) the son of Benjamin Hoskins Paddock Sr. and Olga Emelia Elizabeth Paddock (née Gunderson). He served in the United States Navy as an S2 (Seaman Second Class) during World War II.

In the 1950s in Tucson, Arizona, he operated a service station where he sold used cars. He later sold garbage disposal units under the name of Arizona Disposer Company and was connected with the operation of a nightclub in Tucson. In the late 1950s, Paddock volunteered with the Pima County Juvenile Probation Department and in 1959 was named special deputy to handle cases of wayward youths.

== Criminal career ==
In 1946, Paddock was convicted of ten counts of auto larceny and five counts of confidence game and was confined at the Illinois State Penitentiary until July 1951. In 1953, he was convicted of conspiracy in connection with a bad check passing operation and was again held at the Illinois State Penitentiary until August 1956. In one of his early arrests, he was found with a concealed revolver.

He was accused of robbing branches of the Valley National Bank of Arizona in Phoenix of $11,210 ($123,809 in 2025 dollars) on February 19, 1959, and of $9,285 ($101,049 in 2025 dollars) on January 29, 1960. Paddock robbed another branch of $4,620 ($50,280 in 2025 dollars) on July 26, 1960. He was captured and then convicted for the third robbery in federal court in January 1961. During his arrest, he attempted to run down an FBI agent with his car. He was sentenced to 20 years in prison. On December 30, 1968, Paddock escaped from the Federal Correctional Institution, La Tuna in Anthony, Texas. A warrant for his arrest relating to his escape was issued on February 3, 1969, and he was placed on the FBI Ten Most Wanted list.

Most individuals who have been on the FBI Ten Most Wanted list are off the list in less than six months. Paddock was among those who were on the list the longest, being placed on the list on June 10, 1969, and removed on May 5, 1977. While on the most wanted list, he was described as being 6 ft 4 in (1.93 m) tall, weighing 245 pounds (111 kg), having blond hair, but being balding and frequently shaved. He had green eyes and wore contact lenses or glasses. He also had a scar above his right eyebrow and on his right knee and had a birthmark on his left ankle. He was described as a smooth talker, as arrogant and egotistical, liking cigars, cigarettes, and steaks. He also played bridge, enjoyed gambling, and watching sports, particularly baseball, for which he also worked as an umpire. During his criminal career, Paddock had numerous aliases, including Perry Archer, Benjamin J. Butler, Leo Genstein, Pat Paddock, and Patrick Benjamin Paddock. His nicknames included "Chromedome", "Old Baldy", and "Big Daddy".

After escaping prison in 1968, Paddock moved to Oregon where he took the name Bruce Warner Erickson. In Oregon, he worked as a contract trucker and in drug abuse rehabilitation. He was twice cited for traffic violations and in September 1977 he applied for and was granted a license to open a bingo parlor, but his identity was not uncovered. He then operated a bingo parlor for the Center for Education Reform, a non-profit organization based in Eugene, Oregon.

He was captured and arrested in early September 1978 in Springfield, Oregon, and was eventually released on parole.

In 1987, he was charged by the Oregon Attorney General with racketeering related to his bingo business and fraud for an illegal business he ran rolling back car odometers, but avoided a prison sentence by paying a $100,000 fine ($283,392 in 2025 dollars). Later in life, his involvement in bingo earned him the nickname, Bingo Bruce. During the last decade of his life, he lived quietly in Texas where he co-owned a car shop with his girlfriend.

== Personal life and death ==
Paddock married Dolores Irene Hudson (born January 10, 1928) in 1952, and they had four sons, Stephen (1953–2017), Patrick (born c. 1957), Bruce (1959), and Eric (born 1960).

In 1989, he filed incorporation papers to open a church named the Holy Life Congregation Inc. but it never was established.

He died of a heart attack on January 18, 1998, in Arlington, Texas. He is buried at the Fort Gibson National Cemetery in Fort Gibson, Oklahoma.
