= Route 91 Harvest =

Country music festival

- Genre: Country music
- Dates: Friday–Sunday (September–October)
- Locations: Paradise, Nevada, U.S.
- Years active: 2014–2017
- Founders: Live Nation Entertainment; MGM Resorts International
- Attendance: 22,000 (2017)
- Website: rt91harvest.com Archived September 11, 2017, at the Wayback Machine

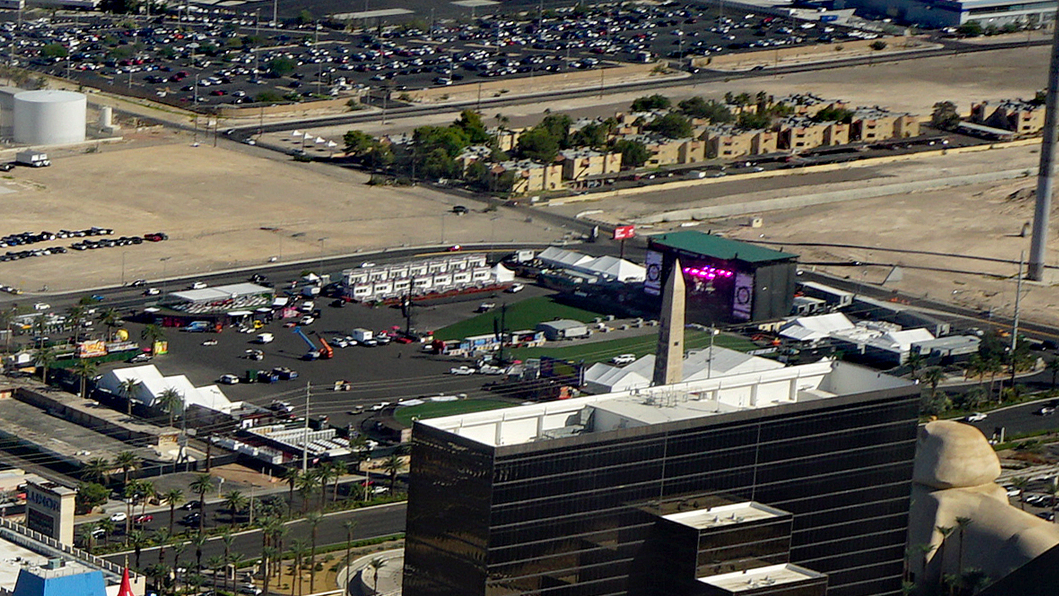
Main stage and artificial grass spectator area of Route 91 in September 2017, partially obscured by Luxor hotel block. Photograph taken from a helicopter during final preparations for the 2017 event.

Route 91 Harvest was a country music festival in the United States that was held annually in Paradise, Nevada, from 2014 to 2017 in the Las Vegas Village, a 15-acre (6.1 ha) lot on Las Vegas Boulevard (former U.S. Route 91), directly across from the Luxor Las Vegas hotel and casino and diagonally across from the Mandalay Bay resort and casino. The festival's promoters were Live Nation Entertainment and MGM Resorts International.

No festival has been held since 2017, following a deadly mass shooting in which Stephen Paddock shot and killed 60 festivalgoers and injured hundreds more from a window on the 32nd floor of the adjacent Mandalay Bay hotel. So far, no announcement has been made about the event being revived.

== History ==
The following country music artists were the major acts in the respective years:

- 2014: The inaugural festival featured Jason Aldean, Blake Shelton and Miranda Lambert
- 2015: Florida Georgia Line, Thomas Rhett, Gary Allan, Lady Antebellum, Keith Urban, Tim McGraw and Brett Eldredge
- 2016: Headliners included Luke Bryan, Toby Keith, Brad Paisley, Little Big Town and Chris Young
- 2017: Major acts were Eric Church, Sam Hunt, Jason Aldean, Jake Owen and Lee Brice
- Since 2018: No festival due to the 2017 shooting.

== 2017 shooting ==
The 2017 festival was the scene of a mass shooting in which 60 people were ultimately killed, making the incident the deadliest mass shooting by an individual in U.S. history. The shooting began as singer Jason Aldean finished his sixth song on the final day of the festival and ended with gunman Stephen Paddock's suicide.

More than 1,000 shots were fired into the crowd as the shooting continued for over 10 minutes. More than 800 people were injured in the attack. At the time, the event was attended by approximately 22,000 people.

== Aftermath ==
Following the mass shooting, organizer Live Nation decided not to hold the 2018 Festival. In December 2018, it was announced that the Festival might return in 2019, with it being held at the Las Vegas Festival Grounds at the corner of Sahara Avenue and Las Vegas Boulevard. However, this event did not come to fruition.

A January 2020 article in Billboard magazine on the possibility of the return of the Route 91 Harvest Festival cited several significant challenges that would need to be overcome. These included finding a new venue for the festival, being able to successfully coordinate the booking of numerous performers and competing with existing residencies of country stars in other Las Vegas venues.

In 2019, MGM planned to repurpose the Las Vegas Village as a community center which would host athletic events, and parking space for Allegiant Stadium, but that did not happen. Instead, in 2022, MGM sold most of the village.
