= Sun Valley High School (California) =

Coordinates: 34.235°N 118.396°W

Location
- 9171 Telfair Avenue; Los Angeles, California 91352; United States

Information
- School type: High school
- Established: September 9, 2009
- Principal: Clara Herran
- Teaching staff: 22.33 (FTE)
- Grades: 9–12
- Enrolment: 383 (2018-19)
- Student to teacher ratio: 17.15
- Color
- Mascot: Wildcat

Sun Valley High School was a four-year high school in Sun Valley, Los Angeles and was part of the Los Angeles Unified School District. Sun Valley High School was home to over 600 students and 24 staff members and offers Project Lead the Way Engineering and a Media Arts/Film Production program along with Advanced Placement courses.

== Location ==
Sun Valley High School was located in the East San Fernando Valley section of Los Angeles near the intersections of the 170 and 5 freeways.

== History ==
Sun Valley High School opened its doors on Wednesday, September 9, 2009 on what was formerly the Richard E. Byrd Middle School campus. Sun Valley High School opened as a secondary school in the Sun Valley area to relieve overcrowding at John H. Francis Polytechnic High School.

The school opened in the fall of 2009 to 9th, 10th, and 11th graders. It was remodeled from the preexisting Byrd Middle School which was relocated across the street from Francis Polytechnic High School. The school includes a new basketball gym, new classrooms and science labs, and an extended library. The first year of the school did not include any seniors. The first graduating class was the class of 2011, which were the school's first juniors.

The school features specialized elective classes in the Fine Arts, Engineering, and Film Production.

The school closed in 2020, with Valley Oaks Center for Enriched Studies (6–12) taking over the Telfair Avenue campus beginning in Fall 2020.

== Departments and programs ==
=== Art ===
Sun Valley High School offered a fine arts program. Students were encouraged to take Introduction to Art AB and Drawing AB. In Introduction to Art, students were introduced to the principals and elements of art and design. In Drawing AB, students learned technical drawing.

=== Engineering ===
The school offered the Project Lead the Way curriculum in Engineering. which included the Introduction to Engineering and Design and Principles of Engineering courses and a Robotics capstone course.

In 2012 the school's engineering team was recognized for winning the Aerospace Herndon Science Competition with their entry "A Renewable Energy Source for the 3rd World".

In 2013 the school's engineering team was recognized for qualifying as an International Semifinalist in the Conrad "Spirit of Innovation" Competition. The team placed third in Aerospace Herndon Science Competition with their "Vertical Aquaponics Rotating Greenhouse". The team won a LAUSD Video in the Classroom award for their video entitled "The Ultimate VEX Experience" which documents their first year of robotics competition. The engineering team fielded two teams in the Mini Urban Challenge California Regional competition and placed first and third respectively. Sun Valley's regional championship team also won an award for "best presentation". The regional win qualified the team for the National Competition held in Washington DC. The National Finals Competition was held on June 1, 2013 at the Smithsonian's Museum of American History. The team placed first with their technical presentation and first overall to become the National Champions for 2013.

=== Film ===
The award winning filmmaking program began in 2009 with the opening of Sun Valley High School. It was part of the California Career Technical Education (CCTE) Career Pathways. The Film Program heavily integrated media arts and core content standards into the curriculum. Film classes were open to every student. Students could take Filmmaking 1 and Filmmaking 2. Students in the program experienced Voices from the Industry (VFI) where industry professionals mentored, encouraged, coached, and shared their industry experiences with students. Since 2011, students worked with David Bugliari, Sharif Atkins, William L. Johnson, Craig Ross Jr., and Syvel Sandford. Students also participated in the Writers Guild Foundation High School Workshops and have worked with professional writers, Kendell Shaffer, Fred Rappaport, Marie Weiss, and Sarah Fitzgerald.

The Sun Valley High School Film Program won two awards in the 47th Annual California Student Media Festival. High school seniors Frank Peralta, Jonathan Duran, Arturo Ruiz, and Cesar Verduzco produced the entry entitled "Grad Song". "Grad Song" won the Special Award Category for the theme for 2013 which was "American Graduate". "Grad Song" is an independent student music video focused on failing, trying again, and then succeeding with the help of the community and self-motivation. "Our Voices" is a short documentary produced by film teacher Mrs. Guest-Johnson celebrating the struggles, successes, and dreams of High School Seniors one week before graduation in an environment where only 30% of students were on track to graduation in their sophomore year. "Our Voices" was created to hear students and have them share their experiences with future students and staff. "Our Voices" won the Teacher-Created Award for secondary schools. "Our Voices" also won a VIC Award for KLCS LAUSD.

== Clubs and teams ==
Da Vinci Engineering and Design Team Robotics Team Key Club Human Rights Club

=== Soccer ===
In 2013 the Sun Valley High School Boys' Soccer team maintained a perfect 12-0 record capturing the league title and went on to win the Los Angeles City title for small schools maintaining their undefeated record. They went on to compete in the CIF Southern League playoffs progressing all the way to the finals where they lost to Amino Leadership. The team finished ranked 30th in California and 49th in the Nation. The team was coached by Oscar Cardenas.

=== Students Run LA ===
In 2013, Sun Valley High school formed their First Student's Run L.A. Team.
