= The Ogden =

Coordinates: 36.1700°N 115.1395°W

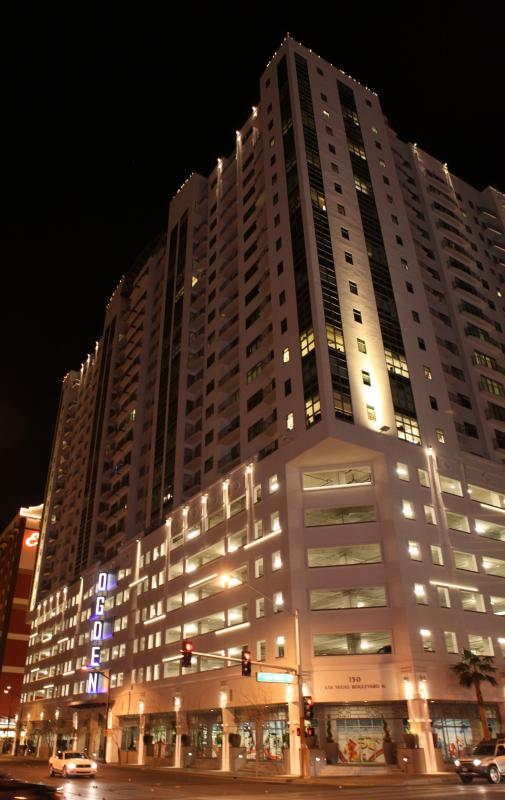
- Interactive map of the The Ogden area
- Former names: Streamline Tower (until 2011)
- Etymology: Ogden Avenue

General information
- Status: Completed
- Type: Condominiums
- Location: 150 North Las Vegas Boulevard, Downtown Las Vegas, Nevada, United States
- Construction started: 2006
- Topped-out: May 2007
- Opened: May 1, 2008
- Renovated: 2010; 2015

Technical details
- Floor count: 21

Design and construction
- Architecture firm: PGAL
- Main contractor: Martin-Harris Construction

Other information
- Number of units: 275
- Parking: 428

Website
- ogdenlv.com

The Ogden (originally Streamline Tower) is a 21-story luxury condominium tower located at 150 North Las Vegas Boulevard in downtown Las Vegas, Nevada. The Ogden was announced in 2004 as the Streamline Tower condominium project, to be built on the former 1-acre (0.40 ha) property of the Golden Inn motel, which was demolished at the end of the year. Work on the property began in 2005, to prepare it for the new project, which began construction the following year. The project was financed by Corus Bank, and was developed by a half-dozen investors, including Las Vegas Stars baseball player Dusty Allen.

The tower was topped off in May 2007, and was opened on May 1, 2008. After its opening, Streamline Tower suffered poor sales as the result of a weak local and national economy. That year, 48 buyers who had yet to close escrow on their units filed a federal lawsuit against Streamline Tower in an attempt to retrieve their deposit money, after alleging that their units were smaller than expected and that they had been falsely promised the ability to make profits by renting out their units like hotel rooms.

In 2009, Corus Bank foreclosed on the property, which was subsequently acquired by ST Residential later that year after the failure of Corus Bank. In 2010, the tower's units were leased to renters. In January 2011, the property was renamed The Ogden, after Ogden Avenue, one of the streets that the building faces. DK Las Vegas purchased the building in 2013, and began renovating and selling the units the following year, as the units' leases ended.

== History ==
In July 2004, Vegas Valley Properties (doing business as Streamline Tower LLC) purchased the Golden Inn motel in downtown Las Vegas, located at the southeast corner of North Las Vegas Boulevard and Ogden Avenue, across from the Neonopolis mall. In September 2004, the company submitted plans to the city for a 267-foot condominium tower with 251 units and 24,000 sq ft (2,200 m^{2}) of commercial space, later reduced to 12,000 sq ft (1,100 m^{2}). The project was being planned by a group of investors led by Patrick McCourt of Barclays North, and Dusty Allen, a former baseball player for the Las Vegas Stars. Allen was among a half-dozen investors in the project. Kevin Kelly was also a partner in the project through Vegas Valley Properties.

Demolition of the Golden Inn motel began on November 30, 2004, to make room for the Streamline Tower, a 21-story, 251-unit condominium tower that was expected to cost $105 million. Occupancy of the new building was expected around December 2006. Las Vegas Mayor Oscar Goodman attended a publicity event held on the property, which included him kicking off the demolition of the motel with the swing of a sledgehammer. The new project would be located in the center of Goodman's planned entertainment district, as part of a revitalization of the downtown area. Sales began on December 3, 2004.

Martin-Harris Construction, the general contractor, had cleared the 1-acre (0.40 ha) site by January 2005, and was preparing to begin construction soon. By May 2005, PGAL had been chosen as the project's architect. A nearby sales office at 425 Fremont Street opened on August 12, 2005, at which point Martin-Harris had begun work on the property for the tower. Approximately $3 million was saved on concrete and steel as a result of the developers locking in prices before Hurricane Katrina.

Martin-Harris spent six months preparing the site at a cost of $2 million, which included the removal of asbestos. Martin-Harris was constructing the project's infrastructure in March 2006, while a building permit was purchased for nearly $1 million. By that point, Corus Bank had agreed to provide financing for the project. The 21-story Streamline Tower was topped off in May 2007, and was scheduled for occupancy in January 2008. At the time, Allen planned to include a restaurant with live music, and was in discussions with a local celebrity chef. A six-story parking garage with 428 parking spaces was also under construction for the new property.

To increase sales, a promotion was held later that summer in which five buyers received free BMW convertible vehicles, worth $37,000 each. The opening was later scheduled to occur in February 2008. However, building inspections began that month instead. Allen hoped to obtain a temporary certificate of occupancy the following month which would allow buyers to close escrow on their units. The project was built at a cost of either $125 million or $205 million.

=== Opening and operation ===
Streamline Tower ultimately opened on May 1, 2008, with 275 units. The opening had been delayed because of difficulty obtaining a certificate of occupancy. Prices for units ranged from $469,000 to $1.35 million. Because of the poor local and national economy, only 156 of its units – 57 percent – had been sold, which was the lowest percentage of sales among five major condominium projects in the downtown area. Each of the property's street-level retail spaces also remained vacant after opening.

In October 2008, 48 buyers who had yet to close escrow on their units filed a federal lawsuit against the property, alleging that their units were smaller than expected and that the property had falsely promised buyers the ability to make profits by renting out their units like hotel rooms. The lawsuit sought the return of each buyer's deposit money. Streamline denied wrongdoing, stating that the claims "are completely refuted by the clear and unambiguous terms" of the purchase agreements. Susan Allen, the sales director for Streamline Tower and the wife of Dusty Allen, stated that sales agents were not supposed to guarantee the leasing of units. Allen also stated that no promises of leasing units had been made during the previous 15 months that she had worked for the project. The plaintiffs also had concerns about the retail spaces on the property, which were still vacant.

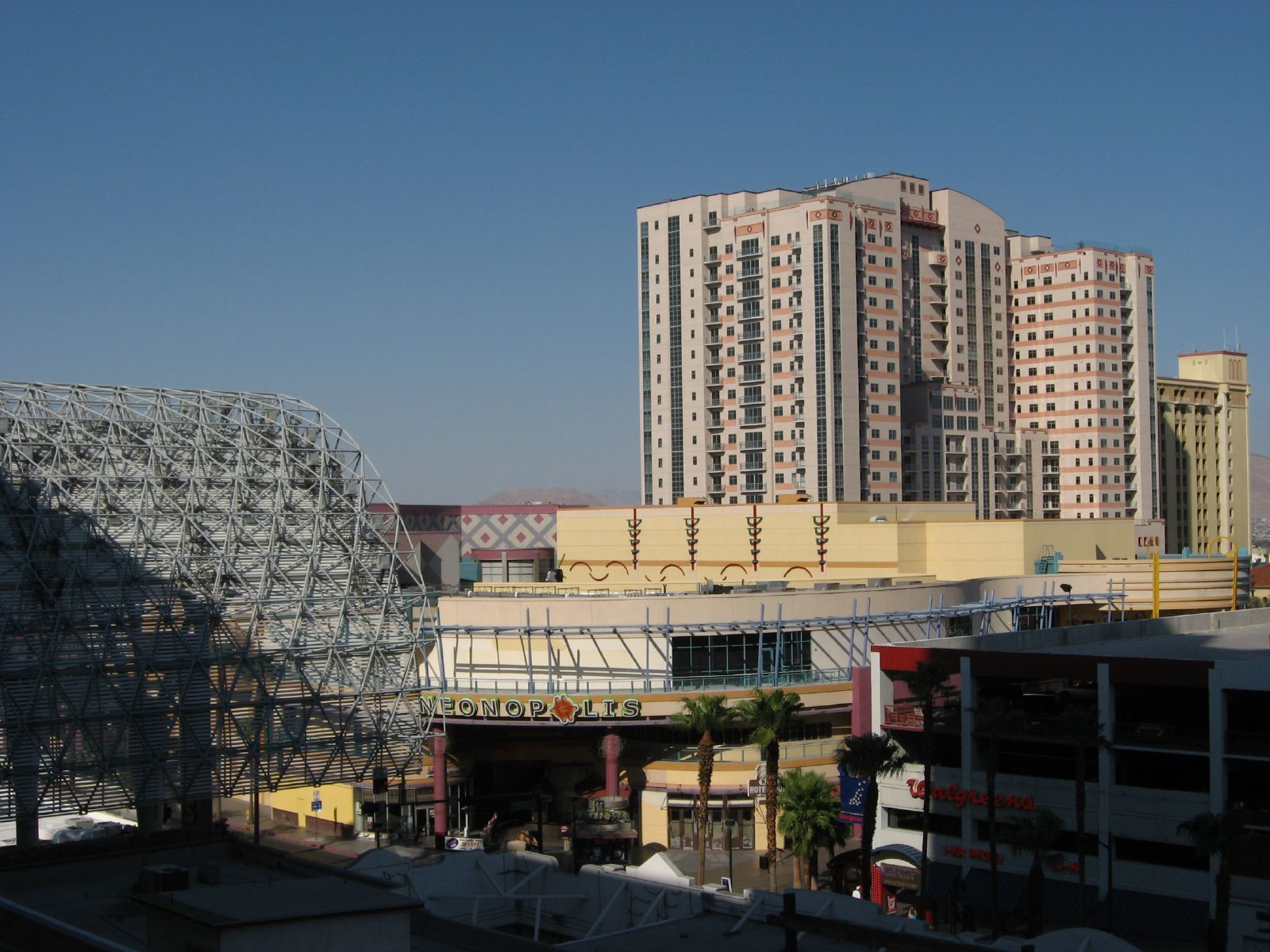
Streamline Tower in 2008

In November 2008, the property was appraised at $60.3 million, significantly less than the amount loaned by Corus: $104 million. Streamline Tower LLC and other companies related to the project filed for bankruptcy protection in April 2009, halting any further action in the lawsuit. Corus subsequently received permission to foreclose on the property, and was owed $108 million by Streamline Tower LLC. In June 2009, approximately 40 buyers filed a lawsuit to retrieve their deposit money. By August 2009, Corus had begun seeking buyers for the Streamline Tower property, with at least two potential buyers interested, including The Molasky Group. At that time, the appraised value of the property was $30 million to $35 million, and the building remained operational.

After the failure of Corus Bank in September 2009, ST Residential, a division of Starwood Hotel Group, acquired the Streamline Tower out of Chapter 11 bankruptcy later that year. In 2010, the building's condominium units were leased, with prices starting at $1,000 per month. The rental concept was to continue for two years, and the company would then evaluate its success and whether to end leasing and sell the units as condominiums. Touch-up work was performed on the building, and included new exterior paint. In January 2011, the building was renamed as The Ogden, after one of the streets it faces.

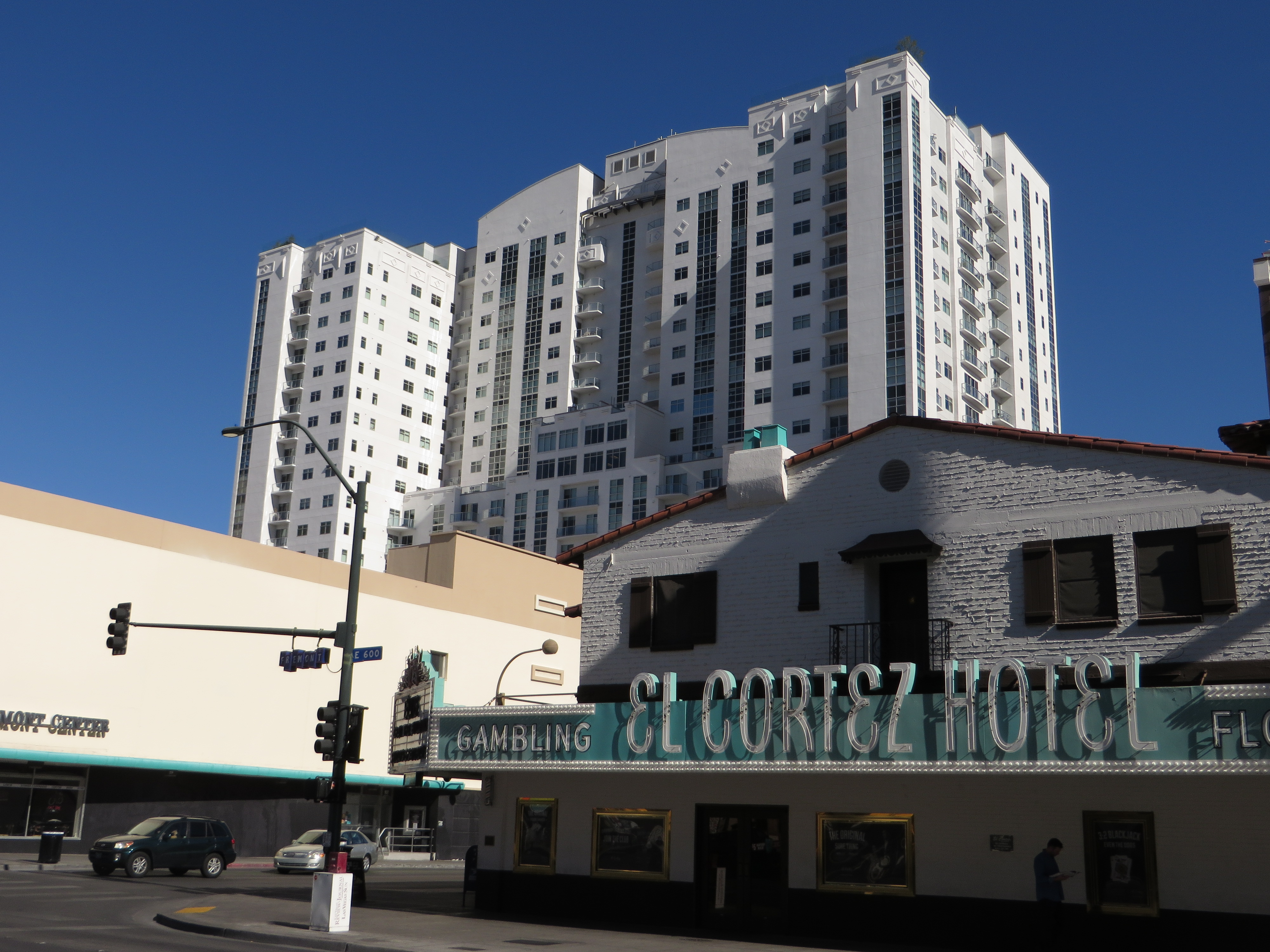
The Ogden in 2014

Tony Hsieh, the chief executive officer of Zappos, had become a resident in the tower as of 2013. Hsieh also leased dozens of other units for employees of Zappos and for entrepreneurs through his Downtown Project. In January 2013, a small bar with a showroom was being planned for a portion of The Ogden's vacant retail space. Private equity firm DK Las Vegas, a partnership of California's KRE Capital and New York's Dune Real Estate Partners, purchased 248 units in the building in December 2013. DK Las Vegas began selling the units as condominiums in October 2014.

In March 2015, the company was spending a $2 million budget on upgrades to the units, 40 of which had already been sold. Up to that point, $1.5 million had already been spent, including a $100,000 lobby renovation, a $100,000 improvement of the building's rooftop sky deck, and a $36,500 revamping of the entrance to add new lighting. Other improvements on the rooftop included a desert landscape theme. Condominium improvements included hardwood floors, granite countertops, green building features, and new lighting. A lounge and outdoor pool were also renovated, as well as all the elevator lobbies. An average of 15 units became available each month in 2015 as rental agreements continued to expire. An Asian restaurant and bar, Itsy Bitsy Ramen and Whisky, opened inside the Ogden in April 2015.
