= Binary explosive =

Type of explosive

A binary explosive or two-component explosive is an explosive consisting of two components, neither of which is explosive by itself, which have to be mixed in order to become explosive. Examples of common binary explosives include Oxyliquit (liquid oxygen/combustible powder), ANFO (ammonium nitrate/fuel oil), Kinestik (ammonium nitrate/nitromethane), Tannerite and ammonal (ammonium nitrate/aluminum), and FIXOR (nitroethane/physical sensitizer).

Binary explosives are often used in commercial applications because of their greater handling safety.

== Law ==
=== United States ===
In the United States, in states where a stricter rule is not in place (see below), ATF regulations allow the components of some binary explosives to be legally purchased, when neither one is an explosive by itself. ATF advises: "Persons manufacturing explosives for their own personal, non-business use only (e.g., personal target practice) are not required to have a Federal explosives license or permit." A prohibited person (a person barred by federal law from buying or owning a firearm) cannot legally possess mixed explosives. Explosives for lawful target practice must be used once mixed: any transport, storage or commercial use of mixed explosives falls under federal explosives laws, and cannot be transported in mixed form without following strict regulations including insurance, packaging, signage on the transport vehicle, storage magazines, etc.

Various regulations also govern the storage of unmixed explosives. As oxidizers and combustibles, the unmixed components still have some shipping restrictions in the United States.

A Maryland law intended specifically to ban the sale or ownership of consumer products containing binary explosive components (such as Tannerite brand rifle targets) became effective on October 1, 2012, and expanded the definition of an explosive to include, in addition to "bombs and destructive devices designed to operate by chemical, mechanical, or explosive action", "two or more components that are advertised and sold together with instructions on how to combine the components to create an explosive".

On August 5, 2013, the United States Forest Service (USFS) and the U.S. Attorney's office in Denver announced that the USFS is implementing a closure order to prohibit the use of unpermitted explosives, particularly exploding targets, on all USFS lands in the Rocky Mountain Region. This region includes national forests and grasslands in the states of Colorado, Wyoming, Kansas, Nebraska, and South Dakota. According to the USFS, at least 16 wildfires in the Western states had been associated with exploding targets. It cost more than $33 million to extinguish the fires. Such a ban has already been implemented by the USFS in Washington, Oregon and Montana. The Bureau of Land Management has banned the use of all exploding targets on BLM land in Utah.

In New York State, a 2020 law included binary explosives, including Tannerite, in the definition of "explosives" that require a permit for their purchase, ownership, possession, transportation, or use within the state.

== See also ==
- Binary (chemical weapon)
- Hypergolic propellant
