= Tannerite =

Brand of binary explosive targets

Tannerite Sports, LLC
- Headquarters: US
- Website: tannerite.com

Tannerite is a brand of binary explosive targets used for firearms practice and sold in kit form. The targets are made up of oxidizers and a fuel, primarily aluminium powder, that is supplied as two separate components that are mixed by the user. The combination is relatively stable when subjected to forces less severe than a high-velocity bullet impact. A hammer blow, the product being dropped, or impact from a low-velocity bullet or shotgun blast will not initiate a reaction. It is also designed to be non-flammable (the reaction cannot be triggered by a burning fuse or electricity), although its explosion can ignite flammable material.

Because it is sold as separate components which are not themselves explosive, it is not regulated by the U.S. Bureau of Alcohol, Tobacco, Firearms, and Explosives (ATF), and can be transported and sold in many places without the legal restrictions that apply to explosives; however, a number of U.S. states have restricted its use. The term Tannerite is often used to refer to the mixture itself, and other reactive targets and combination explosives are often generically referred to as Tannerite.

== Uses ==
Tannerite brand targets explode when shot by a high-velocity bullet. Low-velocity bullets and shotgun ammunition will not initiate a reaction.

The explosive reaction, once initiated, occurs at a very high velocity, producing a large vapor cloud and a loud report. It is marketed as a target designation that is useful for long-range target practice: the shooter does not need to walk down-range to see if the target has been hit, as the target will react and serve as a highly visible indicator.

Binary explosives like Tannerite are also used in some business applications, including commercial blasting, product testing, and special effects. Tannerite offers a "boom box" kit which includes colored powder for gender reveal parties.

For safety reasons, Tannerite Sports recommends using no more than 1 pound (450 g) of the mixed composition at once, and will sell its largest targets with a size of 2 pounds (910 g) to professionals only.

== Target composition and sale ==
Tannerite targets are sold in pre-sized quantities. The package includes two containers. An oxidizer composition is contained within one of the containers and a catalyst composition is contained within the other.

The product, developed by Daniel Jeremy Tanner, and initially formulated in 1996, consists of two components: a fuel mixed with a catalyst or sensitizer, and a bulk material or oxidizer. The fuel/catalyst mixture is reported as 90% 600-mesh dark flake aluminium powder, combined with the catalyst that is reported to be a mixture of 5% 325-mesh titanium sponge and 5% 200-mesh zirconium hydride (with another patent document listing 5% zirconium hydroxide). The oxidizer is reported as a mixture of 85% 200-mesh ammonium nitrate and 15% ammonium perchlorate. The patents on these formulations were applied for on August 20, 2001 (all patents expired in 2022).

Although the patent filings describe a complex formulation including ammonium perchlorate and zirconium hydride, subsequent analyses and user reports indicate that commercial Tannerite has long since abandoned these ingredients, or possibly not used them at all. Independent laboratory testing by the Bureau of Alcohol, Tobacco, Firearms and Explosives (ATF) found that by 2012 the packaged product contained only prilled ammonium nitrate as the oxidizer and aluminum powder as the fuel, with zirconium no longer present in the mixture. This stands in contrast to the patent’s original claims of exotic additives, and has led to speculation that such components were never essential to the function of the product. Instead, critics suggest their inclusion in the patent may have been intended to obscure the simplicity of the underlying chemistry and discourage easy replication by competitors, as Tannerite has historically engaged in aggressive legal tactics to stifle competition (see Controversies). Current safety data sheets for Tannerite avoid naming specific ingredients, referring only to "trade secret" components, but the mixtures described align with a basic ammonium nitrate–aluminum formulation.

== United States law ==
As Tannerite is supplied as components, not themselves explosive, combining the components to constitute an explosive is typically regulated by laws on manufacturing explosives, or in some instances the laws governing fireworks.

In 2013, the Federal Bureau of Investigation issued an intelligence bulletin that said “The FBI assesses with high confidence recreationally used exploding targets (ETs), commonly referred to as tannerite, or reactive targets, can be used as an explosive for illicit purposes by criminals and extremists and explosive precursor chemicals (EPCs) present in ETs can be combined with other materials to manufacture explosives for use in improvised explosive devices (IEDs).”

The Bureau of Alcohol, Tobacco, Firearms and Explosives advises: "Persons manufacturing explosives for their own personal, non-business use only (e.g., personal target practice) are not required to have a Federal explosives license or permit." However, "persons falling into certain categories are prohibited from possessing explosive materials". Those prohibited from possessing explosives include most non-citizens, unlawful drug users and addicts, those convicted or indicted for serious crimes, fugitives, and those who have been officially declared mentally defective or have been committed to a mental institution. There are also restrictions at state and local level. What follows is a sample of those restrictions:

In 2012, Maryland became the first state to regulate exploding targets, requiring users to be licensed.

The United States Forest Service in 2013 banned explosive targets on its property in five different states (Colorado, Wyoming, South Dakota, Nebraska, Kansas) due to the targets igniting 16 fires on Forest Service lands, which cost more than $33 million in order to extinguish the fires.

Louisiana enacted legislation in 2014 to add binary exploding targets to the state's definition of explosives. The vote was unanimous in both the House of Representatives (95-0) and the State Senate (33-0), and the bill was signed by the Governor.

In New York State, a 2020 law included binary explosives, including Tannerite, in the definition of "explosives" that require a permit for their purchase, ownership, possession, transportation, or use within the state.

In Ohio, the act of mixing the components of explosive targets, including "products sold under the name 'Tannerite'," without a permit, can be a 2nd degree felony.

In 2015, Tennessee declared exploding targets including Tannerite to be illegal in the state. However, TN law has a clear exception to the law under Tenn. Code Ann. 39-17-1302(e)(2) stating that "(e) Subsection (a) shall not apply to the possession, manufacture, transportation, repair, or sale of an explosive if: (2) The possession, manufacture, transport, repair, or sale was incident to creating or using an exploding target for lawful sporting activity, as solely intended by the commercial manufacturer."

Under Vermont law, exploding targets were found to meet the definition of fireworks (which includes a "combination of substances") and so, in Vermont, a person must have to have a fireworks permit to use Tannerite.

Select jurisdictions in California have interpreted state law to restrict use of these products.

Various regulations also govern the storage of unmixed explosives. As oxidizers and combustibles, there are some restrictions in the United States on shipping of the unmixed components.

== Notable incidents ==
A Minnesota man was fined $2,583 and sentenced to three years' probation on charges of detonating an explosive device and unlawful possession of components for explosives after he detonated 100 lb (45 kg) of Tannerite inside the bed of a dump truck by shooting it with a rifle chambered in .50 BMG from 300 yards (270 m) away on January 14, 2008, in Red Wing, Minnesota. The man was on probation when he mixed and shot the Tannerite and was not allowed to possess firearms or explosives.

A 20-year-old man in Busti, New York, shot 18 lb (8 kg) of Tannerite on January 13, 2013, that sent a particularly "loud boom" through much of southern Chautauqua County, New York, and extending as far south as Pennsylvania, at least 3 miles (5 km) away. Multiple other sounds of explosions were also reported in the incident. The explosive noise caused numerous phone calls to the Chautauqua County Sheriff's Office, the New York State Police, and other law enforcement in the area.

The September 2016 New York and New Jersey bombings involved improvised explosive devices that contained "a compound similar to a commercial explosive known as Tannerite", set off by a small charge of unstable hexamethylene triperoxide diamine, which served as a detonator for the highly stable ammonal-type secondary charge. Daniel Tanner was quoted as suggesting it was "impossible" for Tannerite to have been used.

An unnamed person suffered "injuries typical of blast injury, such as tympanic membrane rupture, globe injury, and severe burns" due to "close proximity exposure to detonation of the mixed Tannerite blend".

On April 23, 2017, Dennis Dickey, an off-duty U.S. Border Patrol agent, shot a Tannerite target in a gender reveal celebration on state trust land south of Tucson, Arizona, which accidentally ignited the nearby dry brush and started a 46,000-acre (19,000 ha) fire known as the Sawmill Fire. At the time, winds were gusting up to 40 miles per hour (60 km/h) and the National Weather Service had issued a fire watch in the area. By the time the wildfire was mostly contained one week later, it had jumped over the Santa Rita Mountains and crossed State Route 83, spreading into the historic Empire Ranch and the surrounding 42,000-acre (17,000 ha) Las Cienegas National Conservation Area. The estimated damage caused by the blaze was $8.19 million. Dickey pleaded guilty in September 2018 to a misdemeanor violation of U.S. Forest Service regulations and was sentenced to five years' probation. He also was ordered to pay restitution, with an initial payment of $100,000 (taken from his retirement fund) and monthly payments of $500 per month thereafter for 20 years unless his income changes significantly. The payments will total $220,000 over the 20 years, after which the case will return to a judge to make a decision about future restitution. The eventual restitution payments could hypothetically be up to $8,188,069.

On April 23, 2021, another gender reveal party involved 80 pounds (36 kg) of Tannerite detonated at the bottom of a quarry in Kingston, New Hampshire, rattling homes in not just New Hampshire but also parts of north-eastern Massachusetts. Although no one was injured, some nearby residents believe the blast may have damaged their foundations and at least one resident reported that their tap water turned brown after the blast. The person who purchased and detonated the Tannerite turned himself in to Kingston police.

== Controversies ==
Tannerite had originally claimed that "Tannerite® binary rifle targets, when mixed and used correctly per instructions, will not cause a fire" and alleged their targets to be "non-incendiary" in nature, producing only a "large water vapor cloud" upon detonation. However, if the target were formulated only with ammonium nitrate and aluminum powder, other decomposition byproducts would include aluminum oxide, nitrous oxide, ammonia, and oxides of nitrogen which are toxic (nitrogen oxides present as an orange color in the smoke cloud upon detonation). Furthermore, testing performed by the United States Forest Service in 2019 using Tannerite and other brands of exploding targets revealed that they were indeed capable of starting fires from burning aluminum particles. Faced with mounting criticism after numerous wildfires and the USFS test results, Tannerite no longer claims their targets to be non-incendiary in nature.

In 2015, Tannerite filed a lawsuit against Jerent Enterprises, LLC, operating as Sonic Boom Exploding Targets, alleging patent infringement. Jerent countered with claims of non-infringement, patent invalidity, and inequitable conduct, accusing Tannerite of withholding critical information from the U.S. Patent and Trademark Office (USPTO) during the patent application process. Specifically, Jerent alleged that Tannerite failed to disclose prior sales of products more than a year before the patent's effective filing date, potentially violating Section 102 of the Patent Act. Jerent further contended that Daniel Tanner and his legal counsel were aware of this and intentionally deceived the USPTO to secure the patents.

Under U.S. patent law, if a product is sold more than a year before a patent is filed, the patent is invalid. Jerent presented evidence—including old advertisements and trademark applications—showing that Tannerite had been selling its binary explosive targets long before they tried to claim exclusive rights through the patent system. The court found these claims credible and allowed Jerent’s case to proceed.

More significantly, the judge expressed concerns that Daniel Tanner may have intentionally misled the U.S. Patent and Trademark Office (USPTO) by not disclosing these prior sales when applying for the patent. This suggested a possible case of inequitable conduct, a legal term for lying or withholding key information to obtain a patent fraudulently. Consequently, the court allowed the inequitable conduct claim to proceed, emphasizing that while proving such a claim requires clear and convincing evidence, Jerent had met the necessary threshold to survive a motion to dismiss.

Beyond the notable case against Jerent Enterprises, Tannerite has engaged in other legal actions:

- Tannerite Sports, LLC v. H2Targets, LLC (2014): Tannerite filed a lawsuit against H2Targets, alleging patent infringement related to its binary exploding targets. The case was filed in the Northern District of Ohio and was closed on October 16, 2014.
- Tannerite Sports, LLC v. NBCUniversal News Group (2015): Tannerite sued NBCUniversal for defamation, claiming that a "Today" show segment mischaracterized its products as bombs. The court dismissed the lawsuit, ruling that the statements were substantially true.

Tannerite's patent ultimately expired in 2022.
