= Use forms of explosives =

Explosive materials are produced in numerous physical forms for their use in mining, engineering, or military applications. The different physical forms and fabrication methods are grouped together in several use forms of explosives.

Explosives are sometimes used in their pure forms, but most common applications transform or modify them.

These use forms are commonly categorized as:

- Pressings
- Castings
- Polymer bonded
- Putties (a.k.a. plastic explosives)
- Rubberized
- Extrudable
- Binary
- Blasting agents
- Slurries and gels
- Dynamites

== Castings ==
Castings, or castable explosives, are explosive materials or mixtures in which at least one component can be safely melted at a temperature at which it is safe to handle the other components, and which are normally produced by casting or pouring the molten mixture or material into a form or use container.

In modern usage, trinitrotoluene or TNT is the basic meltable explosive used in essentially all castable explosives.

Other ingredients found in modern castable explosives include:

- Active, energetic or explosive ingredients:
  - Aluminium powder
  - Ammonium nitrate
  - Ammonium picrate
  - Barium nitrate
  - EDNA
  - HMX
  - Lead nitrate
  - PETN
  - Sodium picrate
  - RDX
  - Tetryl
- Inert ingredients
  - Boric acid
  - Calcium chloride
  - Wax
  - Silica, often in the form of silica fume (Cab-o-sil for example)

Common castable explosives include:

- Amatol
- Baratol
- Boracitol
- Composition B
- Cyclotol
- Octol
- Pentolite
- Plumbatol
- Tritonal
- Torpex
- IMX-101

== Polymer bonded ==
Polymer-bonded explosives, also known as Plastic-bonded explosives or simply PBX, are a relatively solid and inflexible explosive form containing a powdered explosive material and a polymer (plastic) binder. These are usually carefully mixed, often with a very thin coating of the polymer onto the powder grains of the explosive material, and then hot pressed to form dense solid blocks of PBX material.

There are numerous PBX explosives, mostly based on RDX, HMX, or TATB explosive materials. An extensive but by no means complete list of PBX materials is in the main polymer-bonded explosive article. The major naming systems for PBX use:

- LX-# (Lawrence Livermore National Laboratory developed PBXes)
- PBX #### (Los Alamos National Laboratory developed PBXes)
- PBXN-# (United States Navy developed PBXes)

LX numbers range from 1 to 17. PBX system numbers start around 9000 and use numerous scattered numbers between there and 9700.

Some commonly known PBXes are:

- LX-17
- PBX 9502
- PBX 9404
- LX-11
- LX-14

PBXes are notable for their use in modern nuclear weapons. Modern US and British nuclear warheads nearly all use insensitive PBX types using only TATB explosive, to increase safety in case of accidents.

== Putties, aka Plastic explosives ==
Technically known as putties, but more commonly plastic explosives, these mixtures are a thick, flexible, moldable solid material that can be shaped and will retain that shape after forming, much like clay. Putties normally contain mostly RDX, but may include some PETN (Semtex, for example).

Some common putties are:

- C4
- (Now-obsolete) Composition C
- Semtex
- PE-4

== Rubberized ==
Rubberized explosives are flat sheets of solid but flexible material, a mixture of a powdered explosive (commonly RDX or PETN) and a synthetic or natural rubber compound. Rubberized sheet explosives are commonly used for explosive welding and for various other industrial and military applications. Rubberized explosives can be cut to specific shape, bent around solid surfaces, glued or taped in place, or simply laid on relatively flat surfaces.

Some common rubberized explosives include:

- Detasheet - a discontinued DuPont product now manufactured by The Ensign-Bickford Aerospace & Defense Company
  - Deta Flex - a DuPont military version of Detasheet
  - LX-02-1 - a DuPont Deta Flex variant used by the US Department of Energy nuclear weapons programs
- Primasheet - current Ensign-Bickford product line
  - Primasheet 1000 - Primasheet 1000 using PETN
  - Primasheet 2000 - Primasheet 2000 using RDX
- Durasheet - current Donovan Commercial Industries product line
  - Durasheet 1 - Durasheet 1 using PETN
  - Durasheet 2 - Durasheet 2 using RDX
  - Durasheet 3 - Durasheet 3 using PETN and Aluminum
  - Durasheet 4 - Durasheet 4 using high loading density PETN

== Extrudable ==
Extrudable explosives are an extremely viscous liquid, similar in properties to silicone based caulking materials used in construction. It is used in similar ways - stored in a container, then extruded out a nozzle into thin cracks, holes, or along surfaces.

Some extrudable explosives can then be hardened using a heat curing process. Others will remain a viscous fluid permanently.

Common extrudable explosives include:

- Setting extrudables
  - LX-13
  - XTX-8003
  - XTX-8004
- Non-setting extrudables
  - Demex-400

== Binary ==
Binary explosives are cap-sensitive (detonatable with a standard #8 blasting cap) two-part explosive mixtures, shipped separately and combined at the use site.

Many of these mixtures are based on Ammonium nitrate as an oxidizer plus a volatile fuel, but unlike ANFO (ammonium nitrate fuel oil explosive) these binaries can be detonated by blasting caps. ANFO requires high explosive boosters to detonate it.

Most binary explosives are a slurry after mixing, but some form a fluid with solid components dissolved into liquid ones.

Some common binary explosives include:

- Kinestik (ammonium nitrate/nitromethane)
- Tannerite (ammonium nitrate/aluminum)
- Kinepouch
- Kinepak
- Boulder-Busters
- Marine Pac
- ASTRO-PAK

The historical but now uncommon Astrolite explosive is also a binary explosive.

This category is somewhat unusual in that a single explosives researcher, Gerald Hurst, was responsible for inventing and developing most of the explosive mixtures now in use.

== Blasting agents ==
Blasting agents are explosive materials or mixtures which are not detonatable by standard #8 blasting caps.

The best known blasting agent is ANFO explosive, a mixture containing primarily ammonium nitrate with a small quantity (typically around 6%) of fuel oil, most commonly diesel fuel. Other fuels and additives are used as well.

While ANFO is often made on-site using fertilizer grade ammonium nitrate, blasting agents can also be purchased in prepackaged form, usually in metal or cardboard cylinders. Some brand names of packaged blasting agents include:

- Nitramon
- Nitramite
- Pellite
- Carbomite
- Vibronite
- Dynatex
- Hydratol
- Anoil

== Dynamites ==
Dynamite is usually sold in the form of a stick roughly eight inches (20 cm) long and one inch (2.5 cm) in diameter, but other sizes also exist.

Dynamite is considered a "high explosive", which means it detonates rather than deflagrates.

The chief uses of dynamite used to be in construction, mining, and demolition.

However, newer explosives and techniques have replaced dynamite in many applications.

Dynamite is still used, mainly as bottom charge or in underwater blasting.
