= Incendiary: The Willingham Case =

- Theatrical Release Poster
- Directed by: Steve Mims; Joe Bailey, Jr.
- Produced by: Steve Mims; Joe Bailey, Jr.
- Starring: Gerald Hurst; John Lentini; Elizabeth Gilbert; David Martin; Rick Perry; John Bradley; Barry Scheck; Steve Saloom; Stacy Kuykendall; Mark White
- Cinematography: Steve Mims; Joe Bailey, Jr.
- Edited by: Steve Mims
- Music by: Graham Reynolds
- Production company: YOKEL
- Distributed by: Truly Indie
- Release dates: March 12, 2011 (SXSW); October 7, 2011 (United States)
- Running time: 102 minutes
- Country: United States
- Language: English

Incendiary: The Willingham Case is a 2011 documentary film by Steve Mims and Joe Bailey, Jr. that explores the conviction and execution of Cameron Todd Willingham for arson murder. Equal parts murder mystery, forensic investigation and political drama, the film meticulously reviews the arson evidence used to convict Willingham, and immerses audiences in contemporary struggles over the case.

Incendiary won the Louis Black Special Jury Award in its debut at the 2011 South By Southwest (SXSW) Film Festival. It also screened in the Sterling US Feature Competition at the 2011 American Film Institute / Discovery Channel Silverdocs Festival. It was released in United States cinemas in fall 2011 to good reviews, in iTunes Movies in 2012, and continues to screen in U.S. theaters via Tugg.

== Synopsis ==
The film mixes stylized recreations of fire science with cinema verité coverage of efforts to review Willingham's case—by the Texas Forensic Science Commission and within the Texas court system. It also features in-depth conversations with Willingham defense counsel David Martin, who maintains his client's innocence vociferously. A press conference with Willingham's ex-wife Stacy Kuykendall on the courthouse steps of a Court of Inquiry hearing into the case is also captured, cut against the court's review of the evidence against Willingham.

Amid the struggles in the courts and political sphere over the Willingham case, consensus mounts in the scientific community that there is no valid evidence of arson to meet any standard for criminal indictment of Willingham, who was imprisoned for twelve years, and executed for the fire deaths of his three young daughters. The film juxtaposes this scientific consensus with impassioned statements from Willingham's outspoken detractors, most notably defense counsel David Martin, Governor Perry and Perry's new appointee to the Forensic Science Commission, Chairman John Bradley. The film's subjects also contemplate the case's implications for the American system of justice, and the use of forensic science in the courtroom.

=== Political controversy over the Willingham case ===
The film also depicts political rancor over the case. Texas Governor Rick Perry, who denied a stay of execution for Willingham in 2004, characterizes Willingham as a "monster," and suddenly removes members of the Forensic Science Commission two days before they were scheduled to hear testimony on the Willingham arson evidence. Gov. Perry appoints political ally John Bradley as the commission's new chair, who delays and attempts to minimize public discussions of the case. Rick Perry wins the Republican nomination, and reelection as Texas Governor, two weeks after the Texas Third Court of Appeals halts a District Court Judge's Court of Inquiry into the Willingham case. The Texas Senate ultimately refuses to confirm John Bradley as Texas Forensic Science Commission Chair, but Bradley's appeal to Texas Attorney General Greg Abbott to limit the jurisdiction of the Texas Forensic Science Commission is granted after Bradley's position expires, in July 2011. Attorney General Abbott, whom Perry appointed in 2002, advises the commission that it has no jurisdiction to look into the physical evidence of the Willingham case, and that exceeding jurisdiction would subject commissioners to individual civil liability. (Though the timing remains unmentioned in the film, the opinion is delivered two weeks before Gov. Perry announces his candidacy for President of the United States, and five years after the Forensic Science Commission initially accepted the Willingham/Willis complaint. Also the Attorney General’s office had a representative attending every Forensic Science Commission meeting from its inception, and never previously questioned the body's jurisdiction; Assistant AG Barbara Deane can be seen in meetings documented in the film.) The film looks upon the anti-death penalty movement's seizing upon the case with some skepticism: the primary voices of the film emphasize scientific standards and due process; however they also acknowledge Supreme Court Justice Antonin Scalia's invitation to anti-death penalty groups looking for a case to seize upon: "If such an event had occurred in recent years, we would not have to hunt for it; the innocent's name would be shouted from the rooftops."

== Production ==
Joe Bailey, Jr., at the time a postdoctoral fellow at the University of Texas School of Law, was enrolled in Steve Mims' film production class at Austin Filmworks. (Mims, well known for instructing generations of noteworthy Austin film talent and as a director of narrative films and short documentaries, teaches at the University of Texas School of Radio Television Film and through Austin Filmworks.) Before Incendiary, Bailey had mostly documented musicians, and had not yet completed a feature-length film. Bailey and Mims had an after-class discussion about clemency in the Texas justice system. Mims recommended David Grann's "Trial By Fire" to Bailey, which had recently been published. Bailey read it, and proposed making a film about Willingham's case. Mims replied, "That would be a lot of work. ... Yeah, let's do it."

Mims and Bailey have said that they avoided making a film about capital punishment, although the film, like the case, has been widely cited in discussions about the death penalty. The filmmakers began production with an interview of fire expert Gerald Hurst, the first scientist to review the arson evidence, just before Willingham's execution. (Hurst's work has since been publicly corroborated by scientific experts John Lentini, Craig Beyler, John DeHann, and others.) Mims and Bailey continued to focus upon the science underlying the case in their interviews, but after Texas Governor Rick Perry dismantled the Texas Forensic Science Commission, the film took a new turn, covering each new development in the struggle over the case. This part of the film, more akin to journalism, earned praise for its candor and immediacy.

Mims and Bailey were drawn to the Willingham case by the elements of mystery and law chronicled in David Grann's iconic article in The New Yorker, "Trial By Fire."(see above) The film has been called a companion piece to Grann's article, picking up where Grann left off with its depiction of the more recent struggles over the case. The film also addresses the arson evidence first in its narrative, whereas Grann addresses it last.

== Release and reception ==
At its World Festival Premiere at the SXSW Film Festival, Incendiary won the Louis Black Award. Variety's Joe Leydon called it "a frequently unsettling account of how dubious 'science' possibly led to an irreversible miscarriage of justice." At its East Coast Festival Premiere at AFI/Discovery Silverdocs, Incendiary was an audience favorite. Art Levine of The Huffington Post called Incendiary "A gripping, visually stunning indictment of a miscarriage of justice as great as that chronicled in Errol Morris's groundbreaking THE THIN BLUE LINE..."

In limited theatrical release in the fall of 2011, the film was a "critic's pick" of The Washington Post, The Village Voice, The Austin Chronicle, The Los Angeles Times and The Dallas Morning News. Ann Hornaday of The Washington Post wrote: "nonfiction filmmaking at its most classic. Crime, punishment, morality and hardball politics make for an explosive narrative mix all their own." Sheri Linden of the Los Angeles Times called Incendiary "alarming viewing for anyone who cares about the American justice system."

In 2012 the film was released on iTunes movies, and had continued to screen on-demand in U.S. theaters via Tugg, an audience-driven theatrical distribution tool, until Tugg closed down in January 2020.

Incendiary appeared on Top Ten lists of the Austin American-Statesman and the independent film blog Smells Like Screen Spirit.

Incendiary: The Willingham Case received largely "Good" reviews, according to Movie Review Intelligence. The film currently scores an "81% Fresh" rating on Rotten Tomatoes.

== Awards ==
In addition to the 2011 SXSW Film Festival Louis Black Award, in 2012, filmmakers Steve Mims and Joe Bailey, Jr. received the Innocence Network Journalism Award. Mims and Bailey's work was selected by a panel of investigative journalists "to honor the investigative reporters whose work best brings to life the process of identifying and exonerating wrongfully convicted individuals." The filmmakers were formally honored at the Innocence Network's annual gathering of exonerees and legal counsel.
