= Cordtex =

Type of detonating cord

Cordtex is a type of detonating cord generally used in mining. "Cordtex" and "Primacord" are two of many trademarks which have slipped into use as a generic term for detonating cord.

It uses an explosive core of pentaerythritol tetranitrate (PETN) inside its plastic coating. It is commonly the thickness of electrical extension cord and has a detonation velocity of approximately 6000–7000 metres per second. It is used to "daisychain" a sequence of explosives together.

It can also be used in short lengths in simple boobytraps and early warning devices.
