= MG FF cannon =

20 mm autocannon aircraft armament

MG FF
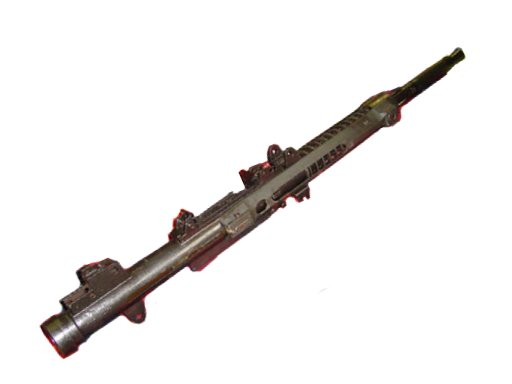
- A restored MG FF cannon
- Type: Aircraft Cannon
- Place of origin: Nazi Germany

Service history
- Wars: World War II

Production history
- Manufacturer: Ikaria

Specifications
- Mass: 26.3 kg (58 lb)
- Length: 1,337 mm (52.6 in)
- Barrel length: 822 mm (32.4 in)
- Shell: 20×80mm RB
- Caliber: 20 mm
- Action: API blowback
- Rate of fire: 520-540 rpm
- Muzzle velocity: 585, 600 or 700 m/s
- Feed system: Drum 30,45,60,90 rounds

The MG FF was a drum-fed, blowback-operated, 20 mm aircraft autocannon, developed in 1936 by Ikaria Werke Berlin of Germany. It was a derivative of the Swiss Oerlikon FF F cannon (its FF suffix indicating Flügel Fest, for a fixed-mount, wing location from the Swiss original), with the Oerlikon FF design itself a development of the Imperial German World War I Becker 20 mm cannon, and was designed to be used in space-limited, fixed mountings such as inside aircraft wings, although it saw use as both an offensive and a defensive weapon, in both fixed and flexible format. It saw widespread use in those roles by the German Luftwaffe, particularly during the early stages of World War II, although from 1941 onwards it was gradually replaced by the Mauser firm's 20 mm MG 151/20, which had both a higher rate of fire and muzzle velocity.

One major disadvantage of the MG FF cannon was its extremely low ammunition count. One cannon only carried 90 rounds, and these were fired very quickly.

== Development ==
MG FF stands for Maschinengewehr Flügel Fest, which translates into "machine gun, wing, fixed"; this reflects the fact that in Luftwaffe practice guns of 20 mm or less were designated as "machine guns" (maschinengewehr) as opposed to larger "machine cannons", or autocannons, which were "MK", for maschinenkanone. The "wing, fixed" part reflects the fact that the primary motivation behind its design was to create a 20 mm caliber weapon that was compact and light enough to be mounted in the wings of aircraft, especially fighters.

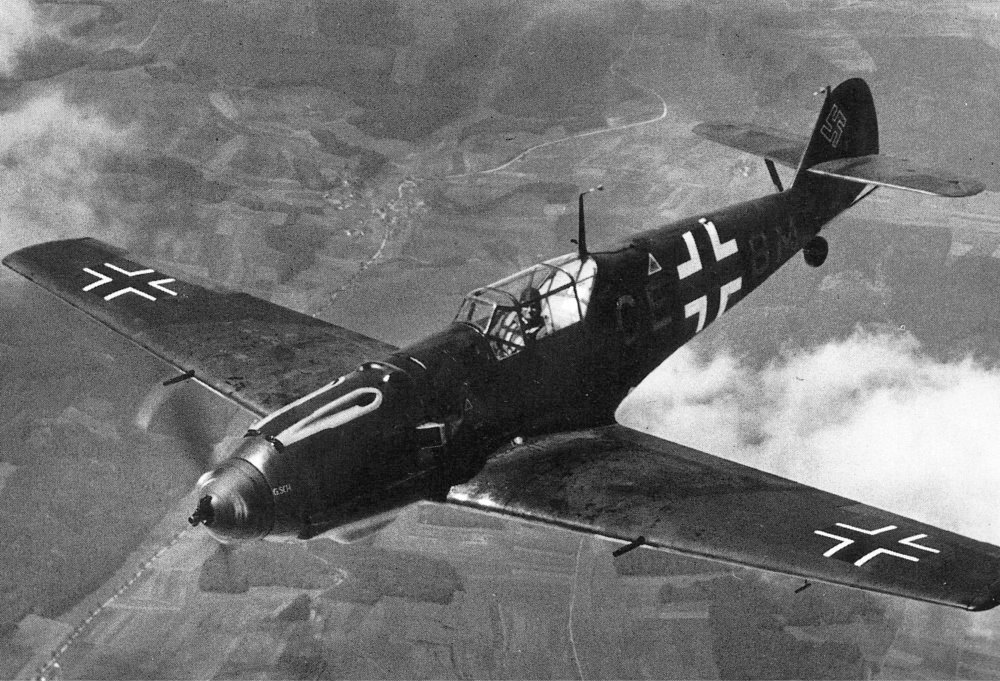
Bf 109E-3 with wing-mounted MG FF

Compared to rival designs, such as the Hispano-Suiza HS.404 – which had been developed from the larger Oerlikon FF S – the MG FF had some disadvantages, such as low rate of fire and low muzzle velocity, as well as limited ammunition storage in its drums. On the other hand, it was much lighter and shorter. Even with its compact size, wing installation on the Messerschmitt Bf 109 and Focke-Wulf Fw 190 fighters was not easy, as the drum required substantial space, and as a consequence the ammunition storage was initially reduced to 60 shells per drum. An ammunition drum of 90-round nominal capacity was developed for the Fw 190 A-5, and retrofitted to some earlier variants. There were also experiments with belt feedings.

The MG FF was adapted to fire a new type of high-capacity, high-explosive "mine shell" that featured a projectile with thinner walls that allowed increased explosive charge. This projectile was lighter and thus had a higher muzzle velocity than the previous ammunition; this also entailed that it generated less recoil than earlier projectiles requiring a modification of the recoil mechanism. With this modification it could fire the new mine shell, but accidentally using the heavier MG FF ammo could damage the gun. In the interest of avoiding such errors, the weapon was redesignated the MG FF/M. It was introduced with the Bf 109 E-4 and Bf 110 C-4 in summer 1940.

The MG FF fired a 134 g projectile with a muzzle velocity of some 600 m/s and a rate of fire of about 530 rounds per minute. The MG FF/M fired a 90 g HE/M (high explosive mine shell) projectile with a muzzle velocity of c. 700 m/s and a rate of fire of c. 540 rounds per minute. AP, HE and incendiary projectiles were also available (115 to 117 g projectiles, 585 m/s, c. 520 rpm) because the mine-shot was not capable of holding incendiary or tracer parts. There were also different types of high-explosive mine shell fillings with either standard Pentrit A (PETN + Aluminium), a mixture called HA 41 (RDX + Aluminium powder)(the latter had a 40 percent increased high explosive and incendiary effect).

== Operational use ==
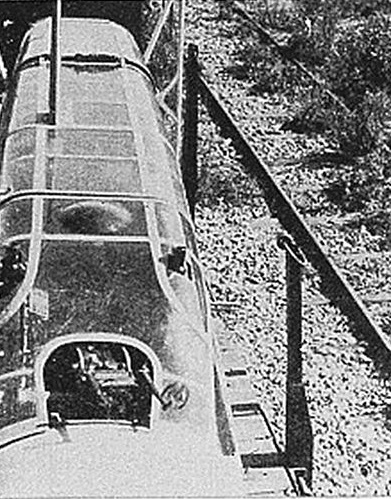
MG FF/M guns in Schräge Musik installation through canopy of a Bf 110

The MG FF and FF/M saw widespread use in fighters such as the Bf 109 E-3 to F-1, Bf 110 C to F, and Fw 190 A-1 to A-5. Early variants of the Fw 190 (A-1 to A-5) were typically fitted with an inboard pair of MG 151 and an outboard pair of MG FF/M, although the MG FF/M were sometimes removed in the field in order to save weight. The MG FF/M fed from a 60-round drum that required an underwing bulge to fit within the wing (90 rounds in the A-5). From the A-6 onward, the MG FF/M were replaced by a pair of MG 151/20 feeding from 125 round belts, or deleted altogether. The cannon was also fitted to bombers such as the Do 217, Ju 88, He 111, Do 17, as well as many other aircraft, either as aerial defense, or more often for anti-ship and defensive fire suppression. Although the MG FF was often replaced with the 20 mm MG 151/20 from 1941 onwards, it saw a comeback in 1943 as the primary Schräge Musik gun in the Bf 110 (and other) night fighters, as it fit perfectly into the rear cockpit, muzzle velocity was less important in this application, and there were also stocks of surplus guns and ammunition available.

== Technical data ==
- Weight: 26.3 kg
- Length: 1.37 m
- Muzzle velocity:
  - 600 m/s (2,000 ft/s) (MG FF with HE),
  - 585 m/s (1,920 ft/s) (MG FF/M with AP or HE),
  - 575 m/s (1,890 ft/s) (MG FF/M with API),
  - 675 m/s (2,210 ft/s) (MG FF/M with (HE(M)),
  - 695 m/s (2,280 ft/s) (MG FF/M with (HE(M)),
  - 718 m/s (2,360 ft/s) (MG FF/M with (HE(M))
- Rate of fire:
  - 530 rpm (MG FF with HE),
  - 520 rpm (MG FF/M with AP or HE),
  - 540 rpm (MG FF/M with HE(M))
- Round types:
  - armor-piercing (AP) (MG FF/M),
  - armor-piercing incendiary (API) (MG FF/M),
  - armor-piercing high-explosive (APHE) (MG FF/M),
  - high-explosive (HE), all with or without tracer (MG FF, MG FF/M),
  - high-explosive incendiary (HEI), all with or without tracer (MG FF/M),
  - high-explosive mine shell (HE(M)) (only MG FF/M),
  - incendiary (I), all with or without tracer (MG FF/M)

== Ammunition specifications ==
| German Designation | US Abbreviation | Projectile Weight [g] | Bursting charge [g] | Muzzle Velocity [m/s] | Description |
|---|---|---|---|---|---|
| 2 cm Sprenggranatpatrone MG.FF L'spur mit Zerleger | HEF-T | 134-136 | 3 g HE (PETN) + (blasting cap) : 0,6 g HE (PETN) + 0,28 - 0,4 g HE (Lead azide)-(Tetrazene explosive) | 600 | Nose fuze, tracer, self-destruct. |
| 2 cm Sprenggranatpatrone MG.FF L'spur mit Zerleger | HEF-T | 134-136 | 3,7 g HE (PETN) + (blasting cap) : 0,6 g HE (PETN) + 0,28 - 0,4 g HE (Lead azide)-(Tetrazene explosive) | 600 | Nose fuze, tracer, self-destruct. |
| 2 cm Sprenggranatpatrone MG.FFM L'spur mit Zerleger | HEF-T | 115-117 | 3,7 g HE (PETN) + (blasting cap) : 0,6 g HE (PETN) + 0,28 - 0,4 g HE (Lead azide)-(Tetrazene explosive) | 585 | Nose fuze, tracer, self-destruct. |
| 2 cm Brandsprenggranatpatrone (Phosphor) MG.FFM L'spur/Gl'spur mit/ohne Zerleger | HEFI-T | 115-117 | 3,6 g HE (PETN) + (blasting cap) : 0,6 g HE (PETN) + 0,28 - 0,4 g HE (Lead azide)-(Tetrazene explosive) + 0,4 g incendiary (WP) | 585 | Nose fuze, tracer, w. or w/o self-destruct. |
| 2 cm Brandsprenggranatpatrone (Elektron) MG.FFM L'spur/Gl'spur mit/ohne Zerleger | HEFI-T | 115-117 | 2,3 g HE (PETN) + (blasting cap) : 0,6 g HE (PETN) + 0,28 - 0,4 g HE (Lead azide)-(Tetrazene explosive) + 2,1 g incendiary (Elektron)(Thermite) | 585 | Nose fuze, tracer, w. or w/o self-destruct. |
| 2 cm Brandgranatpatrone MG.FFM L'spur/Gl'spur mit/ohne Zerleger | I-T | 117-119 | 6,6 - 7,3 g incendiary (BaNO_{3}+Al+Mg) + (blasting cap) : 0,2 g HE (PETN) + 0,4 g HE (Lead azide)-(Tetrazene explosive) | 585 | Nose fuze, tracer, w. or w/o self-destruct. As soon as it hit the outer skin of the aircraft, the primer charge in the fuze head responded, shearing the fuze head away and igniting the incendiary charge in the projectile. The incendiary charge sprayed forward over at least 10 m of projectile travel. In air combat as a carrier of the incendiary effect, especially for the incendiary shooting of fuel tanks. As an indestructible body, it remained effective even after penetrating several bulkheads. In combination with the M-Shell, it was intended to replace the HEI grenade. |
| 2 cm Minengeschosspatrone MG.FFM mit/ohne Zerleger | HEI (M) | 90-92 | 18,7 g HE (PETN) + (blasting cap) : 0,29 - 0,4 g HE (PETN) + 0,2 g HE (Lead azide)-(Tetrazene explosive) | 700 | Nose fuze, no tracer, w. or w/o self-destruct. |
| 2 cm Minengeschosspatrone MG.FFM mit/ohne Zerleger | HEI (M) | 92-94 | 20 g HE (PETN) + (blasting cap) : 0,29 - 0,4 g HE (PETN) + 0,2 g HE (Lead azide)-(Tetrazene explosive) | 718 | Nose fuze, no tracer, w. or w/o self-destruct. |
| 2 cm Minengeschosspatrone MG.FFM mit Zerleger | HEI (M) | 92-94 | 18,7 - 20 g HE (PETN) or 18,6 g HE (HA 41) + (blasting cap) : 0,29 - 0,4 g HE (PETN) + 0,2 g HE (Lead azide)-(Tetrazene explosive) | 695 | Nose fuze, no tracer, self-destruct. |
| 2 cm Minengeschosspatrone MG.FFM ohne Zerleger | HEI (M) | 95-97 | 18,7 - 20 g HE (PETN) or 18,6 g HE (HA 41) + (blasting cap) : 0,29 - 0,4 g HE (PETN) + 0,2 g HE (Lead azide)-(Tetrazene explosive) | 675 | Nose fuze, no tracer, no self-destruct. |
| 2 cm Panzergranatpatrone MG.FFM ohne Zerleger | AP | 117-119 | none (bakelite filling in cavity) | 585 | No fuze, no tracer, no self-destruct. Penetration 10 mm of armour at 60-degree impact angle, 100 m range. |
| 2 cm Panzersprenggranatpatrone MG.FFM ohne Zerleger | APHEF | 117-119 | 4 g HE (PETN) + (blasting cap) : 0,3 g (Lead azide) + 0,02 g (Lead styphnate) | 585 | Nose fuze, no tracer, no self-destruct. Penetration 10 mm of armour at 60-degree impact angle, 100 m range. Detonation after 5mm armour penetration. |
| 2 cm Panzerbrandgranatpatrone (Phosphor) MG.FFM ohne Zerleger | API | 115-117 | 3,6 g incendiary (WP) + 8,6 - 9,1 g incendiary capsule | 585 | No fuze, no tracer, no self-destruct. Penetration 7–10 mm to 16–22 mm of armour at 60 to 90-degree impact angle, 100 m range. When the projectile broke up, the phosphorus remained in effective parts in the target and burned for a long time. The prerequisite for disintegration of the projectile were sufficiently resistant targets, namely armour plates of at least 3 mm at 45°, at least 4.5 mm at 60°, at least 7 mm at 75°, at least 15 mm at 90°, impact angle; also aircraft components (strong spars and struts). The incendiary effect against protected containers is achieved at a distance of 20–150 cm after projectile fragmentation. |
| 2 cm Panzerbrandgranatpatrone (Elektron) MG.FFM ohne Zerleger | API | 117-119 | 6,2 g incendiary (Elektron)(Thermite) | 575 | Optimized for strafing merchant ships and light combat vehicles. Nose fuze, no tracer, self-destruct. Penetration 15 mm of steel at 65-degree impact angle, 100 m range. Fuze functions after penetration of at least 4 mm shipbuilding steel, incendiary effect due to ejection of the burning elektron shell. |

== See also ==
- List of API blowback firearms
- List of weapons of military aircraft of Germany during World War Two

== Notes and references ==
- "Munitionsvorschrift für Fliegerbordwaffen" [Ammunition Regulation for on-board Aviation Weapons]. Internet Archice (in German). June 1944.
