= Cameron Todd Willingham =

American man executed in 2004 (1968–2004)

- Mug shot of Willingham, 1992
- Born: January 9, 1968; Ardmore, Oklahoma, U.S.
- Died: February 17, 2004 (aged 36); Huntsville Unit, Texas, U.S.
- Known for: Controversial conviction and execution
- Spouse: Stacy Kuykendall (m. 1991; div. 1993)
- Status: Executed by lethal injection
- Motive: To prevent wife from divorcing him (alleged)
- Convictions: Capital murder Second degree burglary Grand larceny
- Penalty: Death

Cameron Todd Willingham (January 9, 1968 – February 17, 2004) was an American man who was convicted and executed for the murder of his three young children by arson at the family home in Corsicana, Texas, on December 23, 1991. Since Willingham's 2004 execution, significant controversy has arisen over the legitimacy of the guilty verdict and the interpretation of the evidence that was used to convict him of arson and murder.

Willingham's case and the investigative techniques were criticized by a 2004 Chicago Tribune article. The case was discussed again in a 2009 investigative report in The New Yorker. This coverage suggested that the arson evidence was misinterpreted. According to an August 2009 investigative report by an expert hired by the Texas Forensic Science Commission, the original claims of arson were doubtful. The Corsicana Fire Department disputes the findings, stating that the report overlooked several key points in the record, such as that Willingham repeatedly changed his story about the fire, himself suggested that the fire could've been an arson but never offered any alternative suspects, and tampered with evidence during the investigation.

A 2011 documentary, Incendiary: The Willingham Case, also explored the case.

The case was complicated by allegations that Texas Governor Rick Perry impeded the investigation by replacing three of the nine Forensic Commission members to change the commission's findings; Perry denies the allegations.

In 2017, the prosecutor in the case, John Jackson, was cleared of allegations that he had concealed exculpatory evidence or negotiated a secret deal with Johnny Webb, a fellow inmate who testified that Willingham had confessed to setting the fire while awaiting trial. According to prison letters from Webb, he faced a campaign of harassment by the Aryan Brotherhood for his testimony against Willingham, who was allegedly a member of the Aryan Brotherhood along with one of his half-brothers, who is currently serving a life sentence for his role in a 1988 murder spree.

== Early life ==
Willingham was born on January 9, 1968, in Ardmore, Oklahoma. He was raised by his father Gene, who owned an auto salvage yard in Ardmore, and his stepmother Eugenia, after his mother left when he was 13 months old. Willingham attended Ardmore High School before dropping out in 10th grade. As a teenager, he huffed paint and glue, and had "been on probation for burglary, theft and driving under the influence and did a few days in a county jail for carrying a concealed weapon". Willingham had prior felony convictions for burglary and grand larceny, and prior misdemeanor convictions for carrying a concealed weapon, public intoxication, and contributing to the delinquency of a minor for supplying paint for huffing to children.

Juvenile officers told investigators that as a teenager, Willingham led a gang. He would recruit easily intimidated younger children, have them commit burglaries, and pay them off with drugs.

In October 1991, Willingham married Stacy Kuykendall, with whom he had been living for several years. The couple had three daughters together: two-year-old Amber Louise Willingham, and one-year-old twins, Karmen Diane Willingham and Kameron Marie Willingham. The family lived in Corsicana, Texas. Willingham had been working as a mechanic, but lost his job in November 1991; Kuykendall worked in the nearby city of Angus at her brother's bar. Willingham often beat his wife during their marriage, including when she was pregnant.

According to Ernest Willis, who spent 17 years on death row for allegedly killing two women in a fire that was later found to have an undetermined cause, Willingham was a member of the Aryan Brotherhood. Willis thought Willingham was innocent and said his case was "just like mine." However, Willis said he felt that Willingham had wanted to be the "big dog" in regard to his involvement with the Aryan Brotherhood.

One of Willingham's half-brothers, Davey Crockett, was reportedly also a member of the Aryan Brotherhood. In 1988, the year Willingham said he met Crockett, Crockett and an accomplice murdered four people in Texas and Arkansas. Willingham admitted that he had been in the same circle of friends as Crockett for a time, but denied any role in these murders.

During the sentencing phase of Willingham's trial, a witness testified that Willingham once bragged about how he and Crockett had stolen someone else's dog, beat it in the head with a stick, and ran it over with a car. Willingham denied the allegation.

== Fire ==
On December 23, 1991, a fire destroyed the family home of Willingham at 1213 West 11th Street in Corsicana, Texas. Killed in the fire were Willingham's three daughters: Amber Louise (2), Karmen Diane (1) and Kameron Marie (1). Willingham himself escaped the home with only minor burns. Kuykendall was not home at the time of the fire. She was out shopping for Christmas presents at a thrift shop.

Prosecutors charged that Willingham set the fire and killed the children in an attempt to cover up abuse of the children and wife. Kuykendall told prosecutors that he had never abused the children. "Our kids were spoiled rotten," she said, insisting he would never harm their children. While on death row, Willingham admitted that he had beaten his wife, but denying ever abusing their children.

During a taped interview that took place eight days after the fire, however, Willingham admitted to "whupping" Amber on several occasions for messing with the space heater in the children's room.

== Investigation and trial ==
=== Evidence ===
After the fire, the police investigation determined that the fire had been started using some form of a liquid accelerant. This evidence included a finding of char patterns in the floor in the shape of "puddles," a finding of multiple starting points of the fire, and a finding that the fire had burned "fast and hot," all considered to indicate a fire that had been ignited with the help of a liquid accelerant. The investigators also found charring under the aluminum front door jamb, which they believed was a further indication of a liquid accelerant and tested positive for such an accelerant in the area of the front door, inside the house. No clear motive was found at the time, and Willingham's wife denied that the couple had been fighting prior to the night of the fire.

Willingham drew suspicion after witness statements indicated that he had repeatedly changed his story about the fire. In at least one version of his escape, Willingham claimed he had kicked the front door down while it was burning. However, no burn marks were found on his feet. In another version, Willingham claimed he had gone out the back door, which was blocked by a refrigerator door.

Willingham's mother-in-law reported that he had told her that the investigators had found "unusual marks on Amber's neck". Willingham had predicted that the investigators would accuse him of choking Amber and leaving her to die in the fire.

During a taped interview, Willingham claimed he had crawled around the children's room in an attempt to find them. He said that his hair was singed, his hand was burned by a melting slide, and his shoulder was burned after a piece of ceiling fell on him. He also suggested that the fire had started in the children's room, claiming he saw an orange glow there.

Willingham claimed he had heard what he thought was the ceiling fan crash in the children's room. However, there is no evidence that any such ceiling fan ever existed. Willingham did not report the existence of a ceiling fan in any of his written statements. In one of his written statements, Willingham had been asked to list the contents of the room. He did not list the ceiling fan or any other appliances.

Although Willingham generally maintained that the fire was an accident, he suggested on several occasions that the fire could've been intentionally set. During an interview with the police on January 7, 1992, the day before his arrest, Willingham suggested that someone else might've come in and set the fire while he was asleep. During a previous interview on December 31, however, Willingham had said he couldn't think of anyone who would be that "cold-blooded".

In letters written to his pen pal, Willingham insisted that if someone had in fact poured accelerant through the house and set a fire, he was innocent and the real murderer remained free. During an interview days before his execution, Willingham said the fire was either an accident or that "someone came in with the intent to kill me and the children."

Former jurors later said a key factor in their decision to convict Willingham was that he had tampered with evidence. Shortly after the fire, Willingham told a firefighter that they would likely find cologne in the floor samples they were testing. He said he had poured cologne from the bathroom, through the hallway, and into the children's room.

Shortly before his execution, Willingham confessed to his parents that he had never gone into the children's room. He said he lied to the investigators because he didn't want to be seen as a coward.

=== Witnesses ===
==== Johnny Webb ====
In addition to the arson evidence presented at the trial, a jailhouse informant named Johnny Webb testified at that time. His testimony has been criticized as contentious for several reasons. Webb claimed that Willingham confessed that he set the fire to hide an injury or death of one of the girls, which was caused by his wife. However, none of the girls were found at the time of death to have physical injuries that were still distinguishable after the effects of the fire. Webb later told David Grann, a reporter for The New Yorker, that he might have been mistaken. He said he was prescribed many medications at that point while being treated for bipolar disorder.

At Willingham's trial, Webb offered an explanation for the individual, distinguishable burns found on Amber's forehead and arm. He said that Willingham confessed to burning her twice with a piece of "wadded up" paper in an effort to make it appear as though the children were "playing with fire."

In letters written from prison after the trial, Webb said he faced continuous harassment and death threats from the Aryan Brotherhood for his testimony. Webb said the Aryan Brotherhood and corrupt prison guards repeatedly attempted to coerce him into recanting his testimony against Willingham.

The prosecutor in the case, John Jackson, noted that Webb was considered unreliable, but he later supported Webb's parole. He told the parole board that Webb had agreed to testify against Willingham despite being offered nothing in return for his testimony and after being warned that he could face retaliation from fellow inmates for being a cooperating witness.

In 1999, Webb was visited by Willingham's pen pal, Elizabeth Gilbert. After this visit, Webb's complaints of the threats by the Aryan Brotherhood resumed. According to Webb's letters, after talking with him, Gilbert allegedly informed Willingham about Webb's location, after which Willingham informed the Aryan Brotherhood.

In March 2000, Webb later Jackson a "Motion to Recant Testimony", which declared, "Mr. Willingham is innocent of all charges." Willingham's attorneys were not notified. Webb recanted his recantation days later. As for why he did not disclose Webb's recantation, Jackson presented letters by Webb, in which Webb gave him advance warning that the Aryan Brotherhood was forcing him to write a false recantation.

==== James Grigson ====
During the penalty phase of the trial, the prosecution said that Willingham fit the profile of a sociopath. They presented evidence that Willingham had beaten his wife, including when she was pregnant, ran a woman off the road, threatened to murder two of his wife's relatives, and bragged about how he and his half-brother had once beaten and killed a dog. Controversially, however, the prosecution also used Willingham's tattoo of a skull and serpent as further evidence that he was a sociopath. Two medical experts confirmed the theory. One of those experts, a psychologist who had not published any research in the field of sociopathic behavior, but only held a master's degree in marriage and family issues was asked to interpret Willingham's Iron Maiden poster. He said that a picture of a fist punching through a skull signified violence and death. He added that Willingham's Led Zeppelin poster of a fallen angel was "many times" an indicator of "cultive-type" activities.

The other medical expert, psychiatrist James Grigson, known by the moniker "Dr. Death" for his repeated testimony as an expert witness in which he recommended the death penalty, said that a man of Willingham's criminal history was an "extremely severe sociopath" and was incurable. Grigson had served as an expert witness for the prosecution in murder trials across the state of Texas. Prior to his death, he was expelled by the American Psychiatric Association and the Texas Society of Psychiatric Physicians for unethical conduct. The APA said that Grigson had violated the organization's ethics code by

"Arriving at a psychiatric diagnosis without first having examined the individuals in question, and for indicating, while testifying in court as an expert witness, that he could predict with 100 per cent certainty that the individuals would engage in future violent acts."

==== Witnesses to the event and days after ====
The prosecution sought to establish that Willingham's conduct at the time of the fire and in the days afterward was suspicious. As the fire took hold, Willingham was driven out through the front door of his house, where he crouched down near the entrance. On seeing neighbor Diane Barbee, Willingham began to shout at her to call 911, shouting "My babies are in there!" At trial, Willingham's conduct at the scene was described as oscillating between collected and hysterical, at times screaming for assistance and at other times calmly pushing his car back from the flames that were engulfing his house. Willingham later said that he removed the car out of concern that it could explode and worsen the house fire.

Eyewitnesses described Willingham as having "singed hair on his chest, eyelids, and head and had a two-inch burn injury on his right shoulder, but the prosecution highlighted the absence of any evidence of smoke inhalation. His wrists and hands were blackened with smoke. He was eventually transported to the hospital for treatment, in handcuffs."

According to their sworn statements, both Brandice Barbee and Diane Barbee urged Willingham to return to the house to rescue his children. According to Brandice Barbee, "All I could see was smoke." According to Brandice, he refused, and moved his car away from the fire before returning to sit on a nearby lawn, "not once attempting to go inside to rescue his children." Once the fire had reached flashover and the fire department arrived, Willingham became far more agitated, to the point of being restrained by emergency services. In the following days, Willingham returned to the house with some family and friends. Neighbors described this group as having an odd levity, which was seen to turn somber on the arrival of authorities.

On returning to the scene of the fire with firefighter Ron Franks, in an effort to recover personal property (which was described as a very usual request at trial), Willingham was visibly dismayed at being unable to find a dart set. Willingham also told Franks that they would likely find cologne in the floor samples they were testing, as he had poured cologne from the bathroom, through the hallway, to the children's room . As for why he poured the cologne, Willingham claimed his children liked the smell.

At a local bar, where a fundraiser was held for the Willingham family, he placed an order for a replacement set, stating that "money was not a problem now."

==== Motive ====
The prosecution claimed that Willingham may have been motivated by a desire to rid himself of unwanted children. The prosecutor claimed the fire that killed the children was the third attempt by Willingham to kill them, and that he had attempted to abort each of his wife's two pregnancies by kicking her in order to cause miscarriages.

Journalist David Grann reported that "...there is evidence that Willingham hit his wife, even when she was pregnant, but there were no police reports or medical evidence indicating that Willingham had tried to abort or kill his children." He wrote, "Willingham's wife insisted during the trial and under interrogation that Willingham had not physically abused the children."

The trial testimony by Webb, a jailhouse informant, suggested that Willingham had set the fire in order to cover up an injury or death of one of the children due to his wife's actions. The prosecutor also said that Willingham was a serial wife abuser, both physically and emotionally. Jackson said Willingham had abused animals and was a sociopath. However, those not associated with the case paint a different picture of Willingham. His former probation officer, Polly Goodin, said he had never demonstrated bizarre or sociopathic behavior and that "He was probably one of my favorite kids." Bebe Bridges, a former judge who was often on the "opposite side" of Willingham in the legal system, and who had sent him to jail for stealing, said that she could not imagine him killing his children. "He was polite, and he seemed to care," she said.

=== Trial ===
Willingham was charged with murder on January 8, 1992. During his trial in August 1992, he was offered a life term in exchange for a guilty plea, which he turned down, insisting he was innocent.

At trial, the fire investigator Manuel Vasquez testified there were three points of origin for the fire, which indicated that the fire was "intentionally set by human hands." A sample of burned material at the doorway of the house tested positive for mineral spirits, indicating the presence of lighter fluid. He testified that Willingham escaped the fire with bare feet and no burn marks. This was taken as evidence that the accelerant was poured by Willingham as he left the house. Several witnesses testified for the prosecution.

In 2009, John Jackson, the prosecutor at the trial, stated that burns suffered by Willingham were "so superficial as to suggest that the same were self-inflicted in an attempt to divert suspicion from himself." Grann, however, said fire investigators who reviewed the case told him that "Willingham's first-degree and second-degree burns were consistent with being in a fire before the moment of 'flashover' — that is, when everything in a room suddenly ignites."

Commenting on the condition of the house, Jackson added, "Any escape or rescue route from the burning house was blocked by a refrigerator, which had been pushed against the back door, requiring any person attempting an escape to run through the conflagration at the front of the house." There were two refrigerators in the Willingham house. Jimmie Hensley, a police detective, and Douglas Fogg, the assistant fire chief — who both investigated the fire — told Grann that they had never believed that the refrigerator was part of the arson plot. "It didn't have [anything] to do with the fire," Fogg said.

Jackson contradicted Willingham's account by claiming blood gas analysis at Navarro Regional Hospital shortly after the fire revealed that Willingham had not inhaled any smoke. Willingham's statement and eyewitness accounts had detailed rescue attempts.

Consistent with typical Navarro County death penalty practice, Willingham was offered the opportunity to eliminate himself as a suspect by polygraph examination, which Willingham rejected, according to Jackson. Against the advice of his own counsel, Willingham declined a life sentence in exchange for his guilty plea. He insisted he would not admit to something he had not done, even if it meant sparing his life.

During his trial, Willingham did not testify. The defense called only one witness, the Willinghams' babysitter, Amy O'Shea, who testified that she believed that Willingham could not have killed his children. The prosecution rebutted O'Shea's testimony with that of Carl Jones, who testified that Willingham told him that he had gotten his wife to do his urine sample for him at the hospital.

One of Willingham's trial attorneys, David Martin, later said that the defense did not have a fire expert testify after the fire expert they hired concluded that the cause of the fire was arson.

== Appeals, incarceration, and execution ==
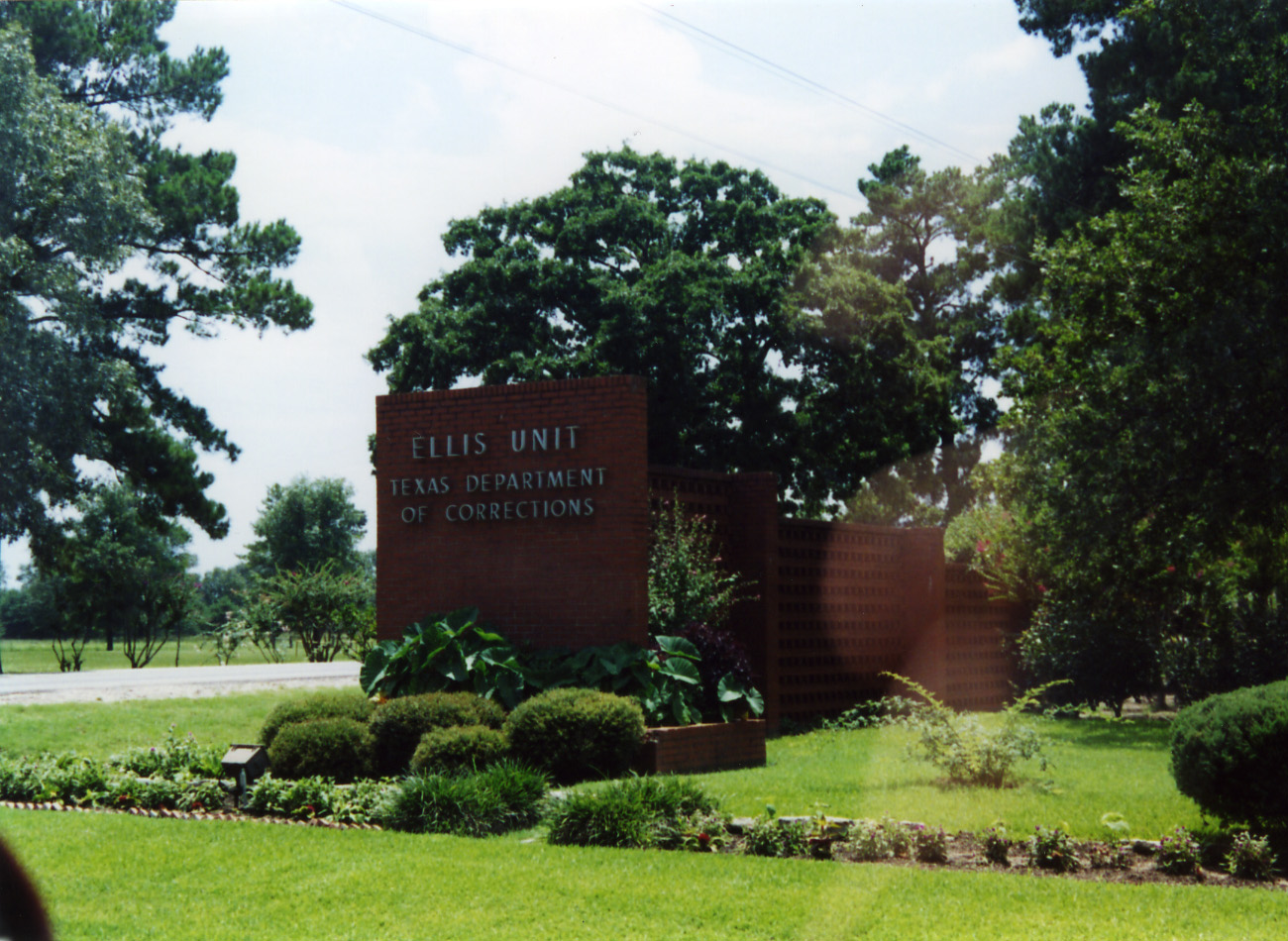
Ellis Unit, where Willingham was initially confined

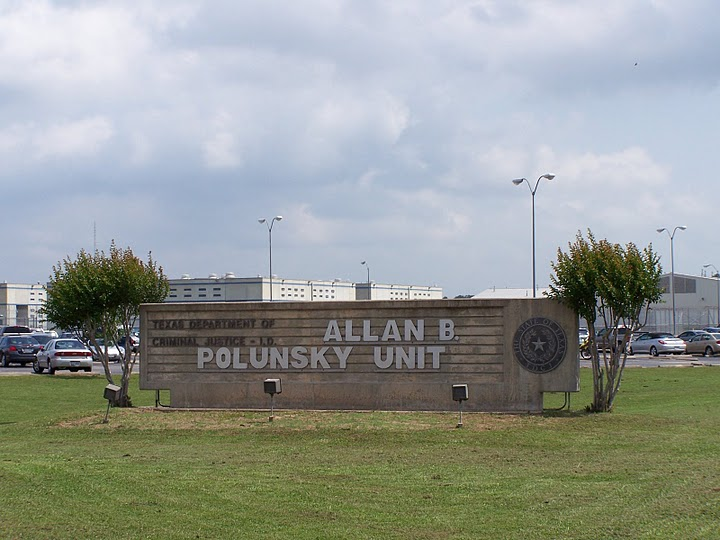
Willingham was moved to the Allan B. Polunsky Unit

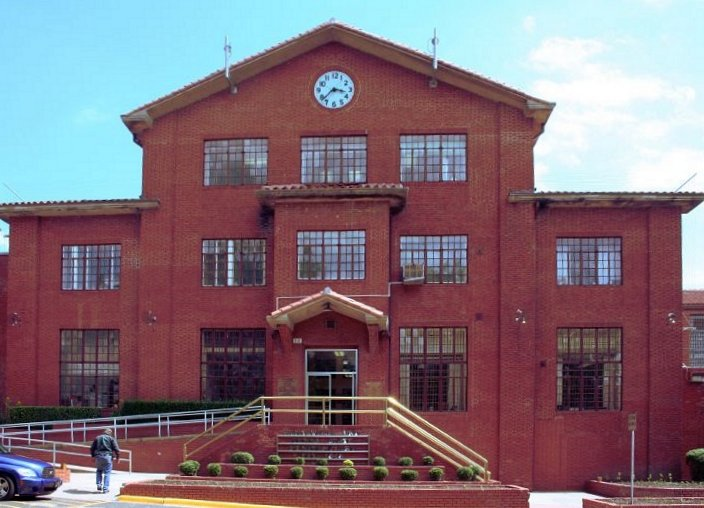
Huntsville Unit, where Willingham was executed

Willingham had the Texas Department of Criminal Justice number 999041. While on death row, Willingham was initially incarcerated in the Ellis Unit, and later in the Polunsky Unit. In 1993, Willingham's wife, Stacy Kuykendall, filed for divorce, which was granted.

Willingham's case gained attention in December 2004, when Maurice Possley and Steve Mills of the Chicago Tribune published an article on poor investigative tactics. In 2009, an investigative report by Grann in The New Yorker drew upon analysis by arson investigation experts and advances in fire science since the 1992 investigation; he suggested that the evidence for arson was unconvincing. He suggested that, had this information been available at the time of trial, it would have provided grounds for Willingham's acquittal. The 2011 documentary Incendiary: The Willingham Case also explored the case.

Willingham publicly maintained his innocence up until his death and spent years trying to appeal his conviction. The Texas Court of Criminal Appeals denied Willingham a writ of habeas corpus a month before his execution.

On February 8, 2004, Willingham's ex-wife, Stacy Kuykendall, had a final meeting with him in prison. A day before Willingham's scheduled execution, Stacy's brother, Ronnie Kuykendall, submitted an affidavit stating that after Stacy returned home from her meeting with Willingham, she called a family meeting, broke down crying, and privately informed the family that Willingham had confessed to setting the fire.

According to the affidavit, Willingham confessed to setting the fire in an attempt to prevent Stacy from divorcing him. He also pleaded for his life, asking Stacy if she could write a letter in support of his bid for clemency because he did not want to be executed.

Willingham was executed by lethal injection on February 17, 2004, at the Texas State Penitentiary in Huntsville. According to reporter Michelle Lyons, then the Public Information Director for the Texas Department of Criminal Justice, known for witnessing almost 300 executions in Texas including Willingham's own execution, Willingham's last words and statement, directed towards his ex-wife Stacy and the witnesses, were so vulgar that the warden of the prison started out the execution to shut him up, with Willingham flicking the middle finger in response shortly before dying. Willingham was pronounced dead at 6:20 p.m., seven minutes after the lethal dose began flowing through his veins. He was 36 years old. After his execution, his body was cremated and his ashes secretly spread on his children's graves at Oakwood Cemetery by his parents. Willingham's gravestone in Rollins Cemetery is a cenotaph.

=== Gerald Hurst ===
In 2004, fire investigator Gerald Hurst examined the arson evidence compiled by state deputy fire marshal Manuel Vasquez. Hurst cast doubt on all but one of the arson indicators, using publicly supported experiments backed by his re-creation of the elements in question, the most notable being the Lime Street fire, which created the unique 3-point burn patterns flashover. In his report on the Willingham case, Hurst said nearly all of the alleged arson indicators can also be found in flashover fires. Hurst concluded there was "no evidence of arson" — the same conclusion later reached by other fire investigators. Hurst said, "The whole case was based on the purest form of junk science. There was no item of evidence that indicated arson."

Hurst's report was sent to governor Rick Perry's office, as well as the Board of Pardons and Paroles along with Willingham's appeal for clemency. Neither responded to Willingham's appeals. In response to allegations that he allowed the execution of an innocent man, Perry was quoted as stating, "Willingham was a monster. He was a guy who murdered his three children, who tried to beat his wife into an abortion so that he wouldn't have those kids. Person after person has stood up and testified to facts of this case that quite frankly you all aren't covering." A spokeswoman for Governor Perry said he had weighed the "totality of the issues that led to (Willingham's) conviction." The spokeswoman added he was aware of a "claim of a reinterpretation of (the) arson testimony."

During a court hearing on the Willingham case in 2010, Hurst conceded that although he had found no evidence of arson in the case, he could not rule out the possibility of arson as the cause of the fire. He also said it was not possible to rule out arson as the cause of any fire.

In regard to the Willingham case, Hurst said the only arson indicator which he thought had potential validity was the positive chemical tests for accelerant. The threshold of the front door was the only place where an accelerant was verified by laboratory tests, and a photograph taken of the house before the fire showed that a charcoal grill was there. Hurst speculated that water sprayed by firefighters could have caused the lighter fluid to float from the melted container, across the concrete, and into the home.

While disputing the allegations of negligence and misconduct, the Corsicana Fire Department said this theory had been brought up at the trial and ruled out. Photos showed that the house was slightly higher than the porch. The threshold was under the front door, inside the house. Water on the porch was observed flowing away from the threshold and toward the front of the porch rather than into the house. There was also a gap between the concrete front porch and the front door.

== Question of guilt ==
Since Willingham's execution, persistent questions have been raised as to the accuracy of the forensic evidence used in the conviction: specifically, whether it can be proven that an accelerant was used to start the fatal fire. Hurst reviewed the case documents, including the trial transcriptions and an hour-long videotape of the aftermath of the fire scene. Hurst said in December 2004 that "There's nothing to suggest to any reasonable arson investigator that this was an arson fire. It was just a fire."

In June 2009, the State of Texas ordered a re-examination of the case. In August 2009, eighteen years after the fire and five years after Willingham's execution, a report conducted by Dr. Craig Beyler, hired by the Texas Forensic Science Commission to review the case, found that "a finding of arson could not be sustained." Beyler said key testimony from a fire marshal at Willingham's trial was "hardly consistent with a scientific mind-set and is more characteristic of mystics or psychics."

At the behest of the Texas Forensic Science Commission, the prosecutor, John Jackson, and the City of Corsicana have both released formal responses to the Beyler Report on the investigation of the fire that killed Willingham's three children. Both were sharply critical of Beyler. In a 2009 article discussing the reasons why Willingham was found guilty, Jackson recalled witness statements establishing that Willingham was overheard whispering to his deceased older daughter, whose body found in Willingham's bedroom instead of the children's room, at the funeral home, "You're not the one who was supposed to die." Jackson stated that Willingham's comment was an indicator of guilt.

In a rebuttal, Grann wrote,

"If the arson investigators had concluded that there was no scientific evidence that a crime had occurred — as the top fire investigators in the country have now determined — Willingham's words at the funeral would surely be viewed as a sign that he was tormented by the fact that he had survived without saving his children."

An August 2009 Chicago Tribune investigative article concluded, "Over the past five years, the Willingham case has been reviewed by nine of the nation's top fire scientists — first for the Tribune, then for the Innocence Project, and now for the commission. All concluded that the original investigators relied on outdated theories and folklore to justify the determination of arson. The only other evidence of significance against Willingham was twice-recanted testimony by another inmate, who testified that Willingham had confessed to him. Jailhouse informants are viewed with skepticism in the justice system, so much so that some jurisdictions have restrictions against their use."

The Texas Forensic Science Commission was scheduled to discuss the report by Beyler at a meeting on October 2, 2009, but two days before the meeting, Texas Governor Rick Perry replaced the chair of the commission (Sam Bassett) and two other members (Alan Levy and Aliece Watts). The new chair, John Bradley, canceled the meeting, sparking accusations that Perry was interfering with the investigation and using it for his own political advantage.

On October 6, 2009, Tony Ayala, a construction worker who lived down the street from the scene of the fire, came forward and reported that he had seen Willingham run in and out of his home as smoke was coming out. According to Ayala, Willingham did this to save his property, which he packed inside his car. Ayala also said that Willingham initially never said anything about anyone being at the home. He said he had tried to report this on the day of the fire, but had been brushed off by the investigators.

During the sentencing phase of Willingham's trial, Stacy Kuykendall had testified that she only would believe Willingham was guilty if Willingham himself told her that he was guilty. During an interview in 1999, Kuykendall admitted that while Willingham had mistreated her during her marriage, she did not believed he had murdered her children.

On February 8, 2004, Kuykendall met with Willingham in prison. During an interview with a local newspaper after the meeting, Kuykendall said Willingham maintained his innocence at the meeting, although she said she now believed that Willingham was guilty. However, after Stacy returned home, her brother reported that she had started crying and told their family that Willingham had confessed to setting the fire.

On October 25, 2009, Kuykendall told the Fort Worth Star-Telegram that during a final prison meeting just weeks before he was put to death, Willingham confessed to setting the fire in response to Kuykendall's alleged threats of divorce the night before. Journalists Maurice Possley, Steven Mills, and David Grann said Stacy Kuykendall's statement contradicted previous comments, legal testimony, and numerous published interviews before and after the execution. "It's hard for me to make heads or tails of anything she said or didn't say", Willingham's prosecutor said.

Possley and Mills said that when they asked Kuykendall if Willingham confessed, she explicitly said no. Kuykendall disputed this, saying that Possley and Mills had shown up to her home uninvited for interviews. Kuykendall said that when the two asked her what Willingham had said to her at their final meeting together, she said it was "personal" and told them to leave her property.

In 2010, Kuykendall declared, "Todd murdered Amber, Karmon, and Kameron. He burnt them. He admitted he burnt them to me, and he was convicted for his crime. That is the closest to justice that my daughters will ever get."

A four-person panel of the Texas Forensic Science Commission investigating evidence of arson presented in the case acknowledged on July 23, 2010, that state and local arson investigators used "flawed science" in determining that the blaze had been deliberately set. However, it found insufficient evidence to prove that state Deputy Fire Marshal Manuel Vasquez and Corsicana Assistant Fire Chief Douglas Fogg were negligent or guilty of misconduct in their arson work. The report did not make any conclusions about whether Vasquez's finding of an arson was correct.

In 2010, the Innocence Project filed a lawsuit against the State of Texas, seeking a judgment of "official oppression." Judge Charlie Baird held an inquiry in September 2010 in Austin, but Lowell Thompson, the Navarro County DA, appeared at the hearing with a motion for Baird to recuse himself due to conflict of interest — Baird had once affirmed Willingham's conviction while sitting as a Criminal Appeals judge yet had also been recognized by an anti-death penalty group. When the recusal motion was denied, Thompson appealed to the Third Court of Appeals and had the proceedings stayed. (Thompson later received an award from the Texas District and County Attorneys Association for this motion and appeal.)

During the inquiry, Hurst said he had found no evidence of arson in the Willingham case, but could not rule it out, either: "I never had a case where I could exclude arson. It's not possible to do that."

In 2014, The Washington Post reported that Webb had said in taped interviews that he had lied on the witness stand in exchange for Jackson's help obtaining a reduced prison term and financial support from a rich rancher. On March 3, 2015, the Texas State Bar filed a disciplinary action, Commission for Lawyer Discipline v. Jackson, against Jackson for failing to disclose information on his alleged deal with Webb. According to the complaint, "During a pretrial hearing on July 24, 1992, [Jackson] told the trial court that he had no evidence favorable to Willingham. That statement was false."

In his response to the allegations, Jackson noted that Robert Hinton of the Innocence Project was recorded explicitly telling Webb that he didn't care if Willingham murdered his children, and Webb's lawyer, Daniel Biltz, was recorded telling Webb that Hinton would potentially be able to offer Webb legal assistance with a current felony charge he was facing if he agreed to make an unsworn recantation.

A jury later heard and rejected the claim that Jackson had concealed exculpatory evidence or made a secret deal with Johnny Webb, finding in favor of Jackson. Jackson testified that he helped Webb after the trial because the Aryan Brotherhood, in collusion with corrupt prison guards, had threatened Webb and attempted to coerce him into recanting his testimony. He presented letters from Webb in support of his testimony. During the bar trial, Webb refused to confirm or deny his recantation on the stand.

The New York Times reported that Innocence Project investigators said they had discovered a handwritten clerk's note in Webb's files indicating that a possible deal was in play. Jackson was accused of reducing Webb's aggravated robbery conviction to robbery, making him eligible for parole sooner. However, the judgment against Webb reflected that the court had actually found Webb guilty of a lesser charge of robbery, the clerk's note reciting the penal code was itself incorrect, and the court corrected what it believed to be an erroneous outcome of the conviction rather than trying to retroactively reduce Webb's sentence at Jackson's request.

Jackson presented letters written from prison by Webb, in which Webb claimed that the Aryan Brotherhood, corrupt prison guards colluding with the Aryan Brotherhood, one of Willingham's attorneys, and journalists Maurice Possley and Steven Mills had attempted to coerce him into recanting his testimony against Willingham. Webb claimed Possley and Mills had "ambushed" him in prison. According to the letters, when Webb still refused to recant, Possley and Mills told him that he and Jackson had "murdered" Willingham

== Films ==
Incendiary: The Willingham Case, a 2011 documentary film covering the case and its aftermath, won the Louis Black Award at the South by Southwest Film Festival.

David Grann's investigative article in The New Yorker titled "Trial by Fire" (collected in The Devil and Sherlock Holmes) was adapted into the 2018 film Trial by Fire directed by Edward Zwick starring Laura Dern and Jack O'Connell as Willingham.

== In popular culture ==
- Episode 21, Season 11 of Law & Order: SVU, titled "Torch," is based on this case.
- Episode 1, season 29 (series episode 553) 2010 PBS Frontline, titled "Death by Fire", is about this case.
- Episode 9, Season 2 of The Good Wife, titled "Nine Hours," is based on this case.
- Episode 17, Season 7 of Cold Case, titled "Flashover," is based on this case.
- Trial by Fire (2018 film) is based on this case.
- Season 9, episode 1 of Evil Lives Here. Told from the perspective of Stacy Kuykendall.
- The song "Corsicana" on the album Burst Apart by the rock band The Antlers is based on the event.

== See also ==
- List of people executed in Texas, 2000–2009
- List of people executed in the United States in 2004
