= Sheet explosive =

Flexible explosive material

Sheet explosives are materials formed by combining an explosive with a "rubberizer" — a flexible binding agent. The resulting compound is cast into a flat sheet which is typically pliable and deformable over a wide range of temperature. Typical products are generally shock-insensitive secondary explosives, requiring a blasting cap or other detonator.

Detonation velocities are frequently very high, which can improve the detonation synchronicity across the area of a tertiary charge with a low detonation velocity. This property makes them suitable for use in detonation trains which require precise timing and homogeneous delivery of force across a complex surface (but see also shaped charge for an orthogonal technique).

== Applications: as a main charge ==
=== Magnetic flux compression generator ===
In an explosively pumped flux compression generator, explosives compress a coil that is carrying current. In [a similar device], explosives accelerate the plates of a large capacitor toward each other, while the capacitor has a charge. The result is a colossal spike in amperage that can be used, in a typical application, to fire a railgun for kinetic effects or a transient electromagnetic munition for electronic warfare applications. For maximum amperage, the plates must remain parallel as they accelerate toward each other; high detonation velocity is required. In typical designs, however, the capacitor is not made from two flat plates, but from two concentric cylinders. Therefore, sheet explosives simplify construction. The reference cited for this section demonstrates a railgun design using Detasheet C as the sheet explosive.

- Explosive welding
- Explosive forming

== Example materials ==
- Detasheet (legacy; used in 1980s MFCG/railgun experiments, among others)
- Primasheet (in service as of 2013)
- Durasheet (in service as of 1999)
