= Trial by Fire (2018 film) =

- Theatrical release poster
- Directed by: Edward Zwick
- Screenplay by: Geoffrey S. Fletcher
- Based on: "Trial by Fire" by David Grann
- Produced by: Alex Soros; Allyn Stewart; Edward Zwick; Kipp Nelson
- Starring: Jack O'Connell; Laura Dern; Emily Meade
- Cinematography: John Guleserian
- Edited by: Steven Rosenblum
- Music by: Henry Jackman
- Production companies: The Bedford Falls Company; Flashlight Films
- Distributed by: Roadside Attractions
- Release dates: August 31, 2018 (Telluride); May 17, 2019 (United States)
- Running time: 127 minutes
- Country: United States
- Language: English
- Box office: $148,504

Trial by Fire is a 2018 American biographical drama film directed by Edward Zwick. The story is based upon David Grann's article "Trial by Fire" that appeared in The New Yorker in 2009 about case Willingham v. State of Texas. The film stars Jack O'Connell, Laura Dern, Emily Meade, Jeff Perry and Jade Pettyjohn.

Trial by Fire had its world premiere at the Telluride Film Festival on August 31, 2018, and was released on May 17, 2019, by Roadside Attractions.

== Plot ==
On December 23, 1991, Cameron Todd Willingham awakes to find his house ablaze. Despite his best efforts, Willingham is unable to save the lives of his three daughters.

At his trial, the prosecutor, John Jackson, reveals the fire had been caused deliberately, with gasoline spread in the shape of a pentagram and the refrigerator moved to block the kitchen door. Several witnesses portray Willingham as a violent individual. His former cellmate from when he was detained in jail, Johnny Webb, testifies that Willingham had told him the fire had been set deliberately. Despite Willingham and his wife Stacy protesting his innocence, he is sentenced to death.

During his time on death row, Willingham is violently beaten and threatened by both inmates and guards before being placed in solitary confinement for his safety. There he breaks down, still protesting his innocence and having flashbacks to his life with Stacy.

Willingham and Stacy are shown to have had a complicated relationship: she cheated on him, and he reacted violently toward her. But the two care for each other. Stacy stops replying to his letters at the insistence of her grandmother, who believes he is guilty.

Willingham reaches out to a new lawyer, Reaves, in the hope of proving his innocence. He adapts to his life in prison by submitting to the violent guard Daniels and befriending fellow death row inmate, Ponchai James. During this time, Willingham improves his vocabulary and writing with James' help. The latter man is eventually executed.

Willingham’s letter to Reaves ultimately reaches playwright Elizabeth Gilbert, who is sympathetic to his case. Her ailing ex-husband and their two children insist he is guilty. When Gilbert visits the prison, she is taken aback by his calm demeanor. The pair connect over their mutual struggles as parents and their love for their respective children.

Willingham continues to immerse himself in art and poetry and befriends the guard Daniels. The guard starts to question Willingham's guilt after seeing him hallucinate about his daughters and reading his letters to Gilbert.

Gilbert questions the witness statements and Reaves, who made no progress on the case in six years. She visits Webb, the former cellmate. When she questions him about prosecutor John Jackson paying him to lie about Willingham’s confession, he becomes agitated and threatens her.

Willingham’s execution date is set, but she learns that more of the witnesses lied at the trial. Gilbert and Reaves meet with Dr. Hurst, who reveals the refrigerator had not been moved and that the fire could not have been arson, as the jury had been told and concluded. Despite this, Reaves is unable to argue an appeal, and Hurst’s report is disregarded.

Webb recants his testimony, but Jackson covers this up. Stacy is pressured into lying that Willingham had confessed to her.

Gilbert suffers a car crash as Willingham is taken to be executed. She is absent when he gives a poignant speech that shows the improvements he has made while on death row. He asks for his ashes to be spread over his daughters' graves.

Daniels is selected to administer the lethal injection. Along with Stacy and Reaves, he tearfully watches Willingham die. Later, Gilbert, who was paralyzed from the crash, spreads Willingham’s ashes, attended by her own children present.

In an epilogue and news footage, Texas Governor Rick Perry denies any guilt over ordering execution of inmates sentenced to death.

== Cast ==
- Jack O'Connell as Cameron Todd Willingham
- Laura Dern as Elizabeth Gilbert
- Emily Meade as Stacy Willingham
- David Wilson Barnes as Reaves
- Jeff Perry as Gerald Hurst
- Jade Pettyjohn as Julie Gilbert
- Joshua Mikel as Screaming Inmate
- Chris Coy as Daniels
- Jason Douglas as John Jackson
- McKinley Belcher III as Ponchai
- James Healy Jr as Arresting Officer
- Anthony Reynolds as Fogg
- Chris Shurley as Sgt. Marty
- Wayne Péré as George Gilbert
- Petros Papadakis as 1999 Voice of the Dallas Cowboys on the Radio

== Production ==
=== Development ===
On August 8, 2017, it was announced that Jack O'Connell and Laura Dern would star in a feature film adaptation of the article "Trial by Fire" by American journalist David Grann. Edward Zwick was chosen to direct. He would produce the film together with Alex Soros, Allyn Stewart, and Kipp Nelson under the Bedford Falls Company and Flashlight Films banner, respectively.

=== Writing ===
Screenwriter Geoffrey S. Fletcher, who won the Academy Award for Best Adapted Screenplay for his screenplay on Precious, wrote the screenplay for the film.

=== Music ===
Henry Jackman, who worked with Zwick on Jack Reacher: Never Go Back, composed the score for the film. The soundtrack was released digitally on 17 May 2019 by Sony Classical Records.

== Release ==
Trial by Fire had its world premiere at the Telluride Film Festival on August 31, 2018. Shortly after, Roadside Attractions acquired distribution rights to the film and scheduled it for release on May 17, 2019.

== Reception ==
=== Critical response ===
On review aggregator Rotten Tomatoes, the film holds an approval rating of 61% based on 70 reviews, with an average rating of 6.2/10. The website's critical consensus reads, "Trial by Fire has a worthy and heartbreaking story to tell, but this well-acted dramatization is undermined by its aggressive manipulative approach." On Metacritic, the film has a weighted average of score of 51 out of 100, based on 19 critics, indicating "mixed or average reviews".
