= Truly Indie =

Film distribution program

Truly Indie is an "innovative distribution program" providing independent filmmakers the sales and marketing tools necessary to distribute their films by-passing traditional distribution companies. By providing a way for self-funded distribution, Truly Indie aims to enable filmmakers to "retain control" over all rights and decisions relating to their films. The program was launched by Mark Cuban and Todd Wagner's media company 2929 Entertainment in 2005 in Austin, Texas.

== Business model ==
Truly Indie enables theatrical distribution funded by filmmakers themselves, mainly through Landmark Theaters (owned by 2929 Entertainment). The filmmaker pays an upfront fee that covers all distribution costs (marketing, advertising, and publicity). Securing a one-week run in at least five markets, the filmmaker keeps all of box office receipts and retains all rights to their film.

== Filmography - Distributor ==
Title	Release date
Fighting for Life	March 2008
Johnny Got his Gun	September 26, 2008
Allah Made Me Funny: Live in Concert	October 1, 2008
Valentino: The Last Emperor	May 8, 2009
The Cartel	October 9, 2009
Lbs.	March 26, 2010
Dumbstruck	March 26, 2011
Lebanon, PA	April 29, 2011
Incendiary: The Willingham Case	October 7, 2011

- The Prisoner or: How I Planned to Kill Tony Blair (2007)
- Maxed Out: Hard Times, Easy Credit and the Era of Predatory Lenders (2006) (dist. 2007)
- 51 Birch Street (2005)
- Beowulf & Grendel (2005)
- Fall to Grace (2005)
- Cavite (2005)
- Automne (2004)
- The Dogwalker (2002)
- Tibet: A Buddhist Trilogy (1979)

== Sources ==
- Truly Indie official site
- The launch of Truly Indie Press release
- Box Office Performance for Truly Indie at The Numbers
