= Detasheet =

Flexible rubberized explosive

Detasheet is a flexible rubberized explosive, somewhat similar to plastic explosives, originally manufactured by DuPont. Its ingredients are PETN with nitrocellulose and a binder.

== Properties ==
It was manufactured in thin flexible sheets with a rubbery texture, technically known as a rubberized explosive and is generally colored either reddish/orange (commercial) or green (military). In use, it is typically cut to shape for precision engineering charges.

Compared to other explosives detasheet is very stable. It is detonated with a blasting cap or primer cord but not by small-arms fire, heat, water, pressure, or concussion. Detasheet is relatively expensive compared to other explosives.

=== Ingredients ===
Detasheet C, the last and most common version produced, was made up of 63% PETN, 8% nitrocellulose, and 29% acetyl tributyl citrate (ATBC), an organic plasticizer.

=== Production status ===
DuPont ceased manufacturing explosives in the 1990s and when they did the Ensign-Bickford Aerospace and Defense Company bought their product line, including all their equipment and trademarks. The Detasheet trademark is now owned by the Ensign-Bickford Aerospace and Defense Company, which has been selling an identical explosive sheet product called Primasheet since 1984. Primasheet-1000 and Detasheet are identical and when purchased the packaging contains both trademarks.

== Deta Flex ==
A military variant of Detasheet, called Deta Flex, was manufactured in a single thickness (0.25 inch (6.25 mm)) and olive green colored. Deta Flex contains a higher percentage of PETN (70%).

=== LX-02-1 ===
A version of Deta Flex is manufactured for Department of Energy research purposes, colored blue and manufactured in various thicknesses. LX-02-1 contains 73.5% PETN, 17.6% butyl rubber, 6.9% ATBC, and 2.0% Cab-o-sil.

== See also ==
- Rubberized explosives
