= Astrolite =

Family of explosives

Astrolite is the trade name of a family of explosives, invented by chemist Gerald Hurst in the 1960s during his employment with the Atlas Powder Company. The Astrolite family consists of two compounds, Astrolite G and Astrolite A. Both are two-part liquid-state high explosive mixtures, composed of ammonium nitrate oxidizer and hydrazine rocket fuel. The explosives were extensively studied, manufactured, and used in many countries because of their advantages of high energy, excellent performance, and wide application. They still find some use in commercial and civil blasting applications, but have mostly been superseded by cheaper and safer compounds, largely due to the expense and exceptionally poisonous nature of the hydrazine component.

== Astrolite G ==
Astrolite G, the most common type of Astrolite, is a mixture of ammonium nitrate and hydrazine at a ratio of 2:1, measured in weight, forming a clear, viscous liquid approximately the consistency of motor oil. It is a relatively stable (secondary) high explosive compound, requiring a blasting cap to detonate. It has a detonation velocity of approximately 8,600 m/s, twice the explosive strength of TNT. It has been widely referred to as the "world's most powerful non-nuclear explosive", caused largely by a comparison of Astrolite G's detonation velocity to that of first and second-generation high explosives such as nitroglycerine and TNT. Current-generation high explosive compounds such as PETN and RDX can feature comparable detonation velocities and brisance to Astrolite G.

== Astrolite A ==
Astrolite A, a secondary (and less common) type of Astrolite, is sensitized by the addition of finely powdered aluminium to the Astrolite G mixture. Though it has a lower detonation velocity (approximately 7,600 m/s) than Astrolite G, the addition of the aluminium increases both its density and explosive brisance, moderately increasing its overall effectiveness/RE Factor.

== Persistency ==
A notable characteristic of the Astrolite family is its remarkable degree of persistency for a liquid explosive compound. Due to its low volatility, it can be dispersed in an area, be absorbed by the soil, and still retain its full explosive characteristics for a period of approximately 4 days. This has shown to be true even when rainwater had also been absorbed by the soil.
