= Primasheet =

Rubberized sheet explosive

Primasheet is a rubberized sheet explosive identical to Detasheet. Manufactured by Ensign-Bickford Aerospace & Defense Company Primasheet comes in two varieties: Primasheet 1000 is PETN based and Primasheet 2000 is RDX based. Both are waterproof and are supplied in continuous rolls.

== Primasheet 1000 ==
Primasheet 1000 is PETN based, and contains 65% PETN, 8% nitrocellulose, and 27% plasticizer. Primasheet 1000 is olive green colored, and manufactured in 1.0, 1.5, 2, 3, 4, 5, 6, and 8 mm thicknesses.

== Primasheet 2000 ==
Primasheet 2000 is an RDX-based rubberized sheet explosive. It contains 88.2% RDX with the remainder plasticizer. It is equally as powerful as C4.

=== SX2 ===
A British military explosive, also manufactured by Ensign-Bickford. This is very similar or identical to commercial Primasheet 2000.
