= Primacord =

Brand of detonating cord

Primacord is a brand of detonating cord used in blasting. It was developed in 1936 by the Ensign-Bickford Company. Ensign-Bickford sold their registered trademark for Primacord to Dyno Nobel in 2003. which manufactures it in their Graham, Kentucky factory. The name is also used as a genericized trademark for any detonating cord.

== Description ==
Primacord consists of a continuous core of PETN, RDX or other high explosive, bound by textile yarns and finished with plastic and wax as waterproofing agents. It is produced in eight strengths:

Name	Loading g/m (gr/ft)	Colour
Primacord 1	1.5 (7.5)	Yellow
Primacord 2	2.1 (10)	Orange
Primacord 3	3.2 (15)	Red
Primacord 4Y	3.6 (18)	Yellow
Primacord 4R	3.6 (18)	Red
Primacord 5	5.3 (25)	Red
Primacord 8	8.6 (40)	Red
Primacord 10	10.6 (50)	Yellow

Primaline is a related product differing principally in having a plastic jacket instead of textile. Primaline is also available in higher loadings, up to 85 g/m (400 gr/ft):

Name	Loading g/m (gr/ft)	Colour
Primaline 4D	3.6 (18)	Orange
Primaline 4HS	3.6 (18)	Clear with blue stripe
Primaline 5	5.3 (25)	Orange with wax coating
Primaline 5D	5.3 (25)	Orange
Primaline 5NF	5.3 (25)	Yellow
Primaline 8D	8.6 (40)	Orange
Primaline 8HS	8.6 (40)	Clear with black stripe
Primaline 10HS	10.6 (50)	Clear with red stripe
Primaline 21	21.3 (100)	Clear
Primaline 32	31.9 (150)	Clear
Primaline 42	42.5 (200)	Clear
Primaline 85	85 (400)	Light green

== Operation ==
Primacord is initiated with a blasting cap or by a donor line of detonating cord or other high explosive. It detonates along its entire length at a velocity of approximately 23,000 feet (7,000 meters) per second. It is used to create explosive effects and to build reliable explosive charges. It is used in conjunction with other high explosive materials to form charges, including linear charges, capable of near instantaneous results.

== See also ==
- Cordtex
