= Tetrazene explosive =

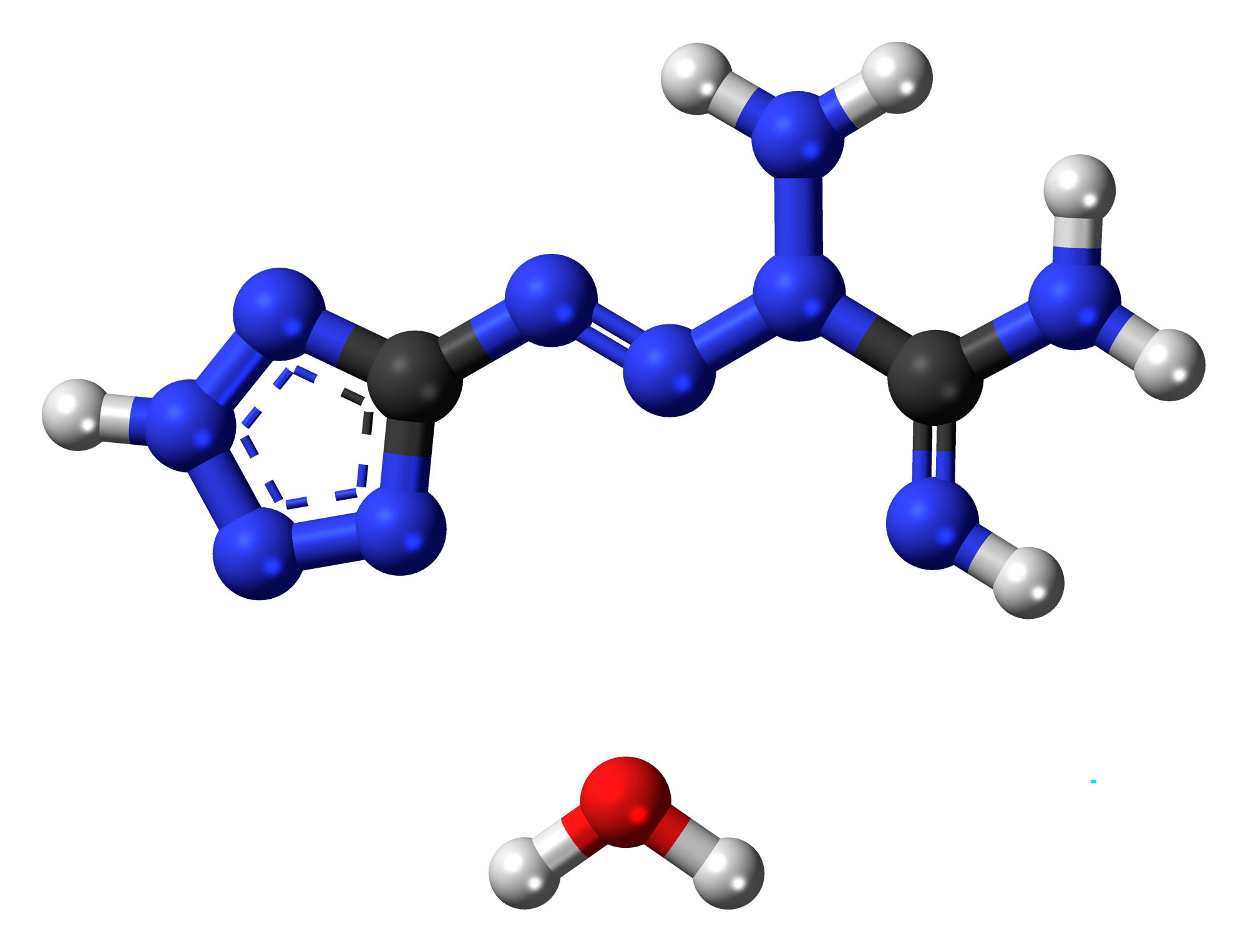

Names
- IUPAC name 1-(5-tetrazolyl)-3-guanyl tetrazene hydrate
- Other names Tetracene

Identifiers
CAS Number	31330-63-9; (anhydrous): 776249-85-5
3D model (JSmol)	(anhydrous): Interactive image
ChemSpider	4589066; (anhydrous): 58541346
ECHA InfoCard	100.128.336
PubChem CID	5486788; (anhydrous): 123436
UNII	U3EB9RU4TD
CompTox Dashboard (EPA)	DTXSID10953376
- InChI: InChI=1S/C2H6N10.H2O/c3-1(4)12(5)11-8-2-6-9-10-7-2;/h11H,5H2,(H3,3,4);1H2 Key: XLZZIAVGIPSWEG-UHFFFAOYSA-N; InChI=2S/C2H6N10/c3-1(4)12(5)11-8-2-6-9-10-7-2/h5H2,(H3,3,4)(H,6,7,9,10); (anhydrous): Key: WSLWDHGXSGRREP-UHFFFAOYSA-N
- SMILES: (anhydrous): N=C(N)N(N)/N=N/C1=NNN=N1

Properties
Chemical formula	C_{2}H_{6}N_{10}·H_{2}O
Molar mass	188.15 g/mol
Appearance	Pale yellow/colorless crystal plates
Density	1.7 g/cm^{3}
Boiling point	Decomposes at 160 °C (320 °F; 433 K)

Explosive data
Shock sensitivity	High
Friction sensitivity	High
Detonation velocity	~4000 m/s
- Except where otherwise noted, data are given for materials in their standard state (at 25 °C [77 °F], 100 kPa). verify (what is ?) Infobox references

Tetrazene (1-(5-tetrazolyl)-3-guanyl tetrazene hydrate) is an explosive material used for sensitization of priming compositions. It is a derivative of the compound with the IUPAC name tetrazene.

Tetrazene is slightly more impact-sensitive than mercury fulminate. When pressed enough, its sensitivity is reduced or destroyed; this is known as dead pressing. It also decomposes in boiling water. In contact with fire, it readily explodes, producing large amounts of black smoke. It is prepared by reacting sodium nitrite with an aminoguanidine salt dissolved in acetic acid at 30–40 °C.

Commercially, tetrazene is added in a small proportions to increase the sensitivity of lead styphnate in cap compositions used both in centre-fire (eg shotgun cartridges) and rim-fire (eg 0.22" ammunition) applications. Cap compositions also contain a high proportion of barium nitrate as an oxidising agent, and scintillating compounds such as antimony disulphide or ground glass which cause the heat of the explosion when struck by the firearm firing pin to rapidly dissipate the main charge of either nitrocellulose or cordite.

== Reactions ==
=== Decomposition ===
The decomposition of tetrazene is quite rapid around 90 °C. A sample of tetrazene was heated in an oven at 90 °C and its rate of thermal decomposition was monitored by infrared and ultraviolet spectroscopy. The thermal decomposition reaction is autocatalytic and it is likely that the same reaction can occur at even lower temperatures, however at much slower rates.

=== Sensitivity to friction ===
Many explosives are considered to be highly sensitive to mechanical stimuli such as impact, friction, stab, heat, static electricity, flame, etc. Since explosive compounds are subject to friction practically every time they are handled, it is of particular interest to be aware of the sensitivity to friction. The sensitivity of tetrazene was determined using a FSKM-PEx friction sensitivity tester. The probability of ignition of tetrazene is 100 percent likely at 27N of frictional force.

== Hazards ==
Instances of occupational rhinitis, dermatitis, and asthma have been reported due to prolonged exposure to tetrazene.
