= Alfred Heinz Reumayr =

Canadian terrorist

Alfred Heinz Reumayr of Vancouver, British Columbia, was arrested by the Royal Canadian Mounted Police (RCMP) on August 18, 1999, on charges of plotting to blow up the Trans-Alaska Pipeline System on January 1, 2000. He was extradited to the United States, and was convicted of explosives and weapons charges after pleading guilty.

Reumayr's plan involved purchasing significant quantities of oil futures prior to the bombing in the hope that the damaged pipeline would reduce oil supplies and drive up the price of oil, leaving him to rake in the profits. However, no evidence ever existed that he even had a futures account.

However, Reumayr was never able to implement his plan. In an effort to obtain blasting caps, Reumayr contacted an acquaintance whom he had met several years earlier while serving a five-year prison sentence for fraud. This acquaintance, James Paxton, subsequently contacted the U.S. Bureau of Alcohol, Tobacco, and Firearms and agreed to work as informant in this case. The two people communicated over email and Reumayr sent Paxton approximately $3000 USD intended for the purchase of explosive ingredients. Eventually, Reumayr and Paxton met at a hotel room in Surrey, British Columbia, to discuss technical details of the plan. Unbeknownst to Reumayr, the hotel room had been bugged by Canadian police, which led to his arrest.

Reumayr was charged with six counts of explosive-related and terrorism offenses in New Mexico, though the scheme was allegedly going to be carried out in Alaska. An assessment made by the Federal Bureau of Investigation concluded that Reumayr's planned attack "could have interrupted oil flow through the pipeline for as many as 90 days" and resulted in oil and gas shortages in California and several other western states. Reumayr's lawyer argued, however, that the terrorism charges were unwarranted, and that the plan was "aimed at making money ... and not hurt anybody". After a seven-year extradition battle, and a failed appeal to the Supreme Court, Reumayr was deported to the United States in 2006.

In 2008, Reumayr pleaded guilty to explosives and weapons charges, after admitting to providing the informant, James Paxton, with explosive materials. He was sentenced by district judge Bruce D. Black of the United States District Court for the District of New Mexico to 13 years in federal prison, with nine years' credit for time served. He was released on December 15, 2010. After his release, Reumayr was deported from the United States back to Canada.
