= Detonating cord =

Thin explosive tube

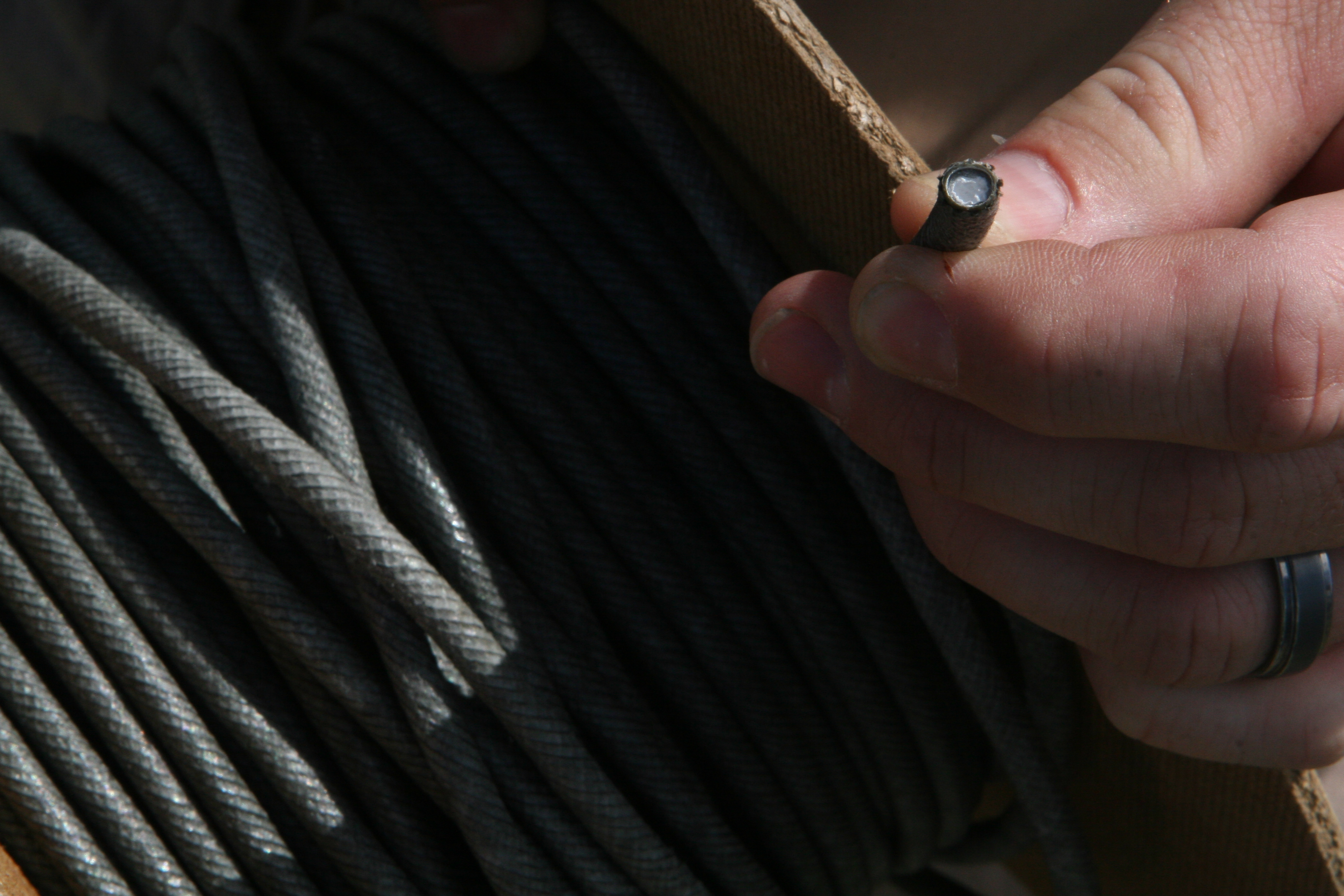
Reinforced detonation cord filled with pentaerythritol tetranitrate (PETN)

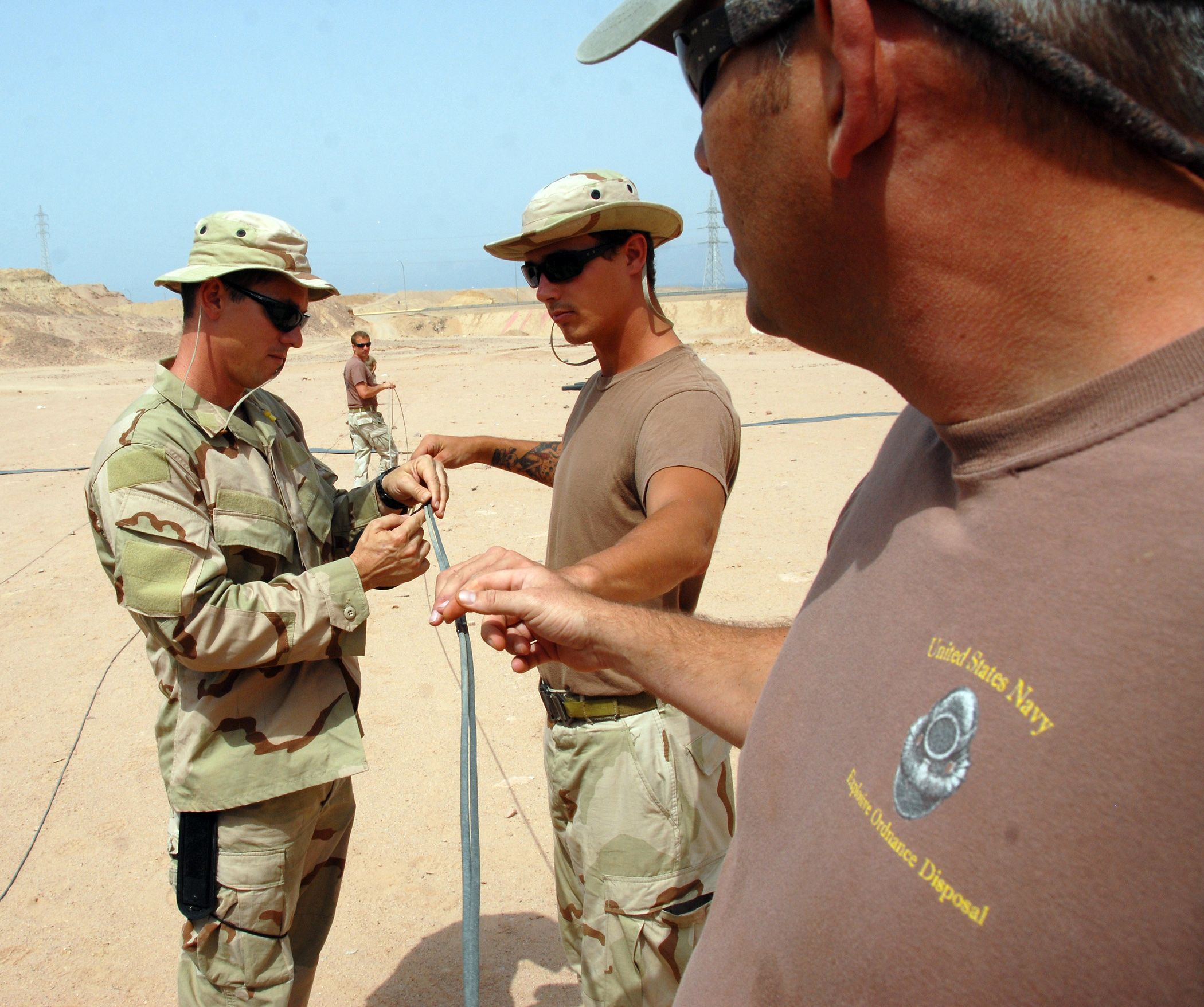
United States Navy explosive ordnance disposal technicians double stranding detonation cord

Detonating cord (also called detonation cord, detcord, detacord, blasting rope, or primer cord) is a thin, flexible plastic tube usually filled with pentaerythritol tetranitrate (PETN, pentrite). With the PETN exploding at a rate of approximately 6,400 m/s (21,000 ft/s), any common length of detonation cord appears to explode instantaneously. It is a high-speed fuse which explodes, rather than burns, and is suitable for detonating high explosives. The detonation velocity is sufficient to use it for synchronizing multiple charges to detonate almost simultaneously even if the charges are placed at different distances from the point of initiation. It is used to reliably and inexpensively chain together multiple explosive charges. Typical uses include mining, drilling, demolitions, and warfare.

"Cordtex" and "Primacord" are two of many trademarks which have slipped into use as a generic term for this material.

== Effects ==
As a transmission medium, it can act as a downline between the initiator (usually a trigger) and the blast area, and as a trunkline connecting several different explosive charges. As a timing mechanism, detonation cord detonates at a very reliable rate (about 6,000–7,000 m/s or 23,000–26,000 ft/s), enabling engineers to control the pattern in which charges are detonated. This is particularly useful for demolitions, when structural elements need to be destroyed in a specific order to control the collapse of a building.

While it looks like nylon cord, the core is a compressed powdered explosive, usually PETN (pentrite), and it is initiated by the use of a blasting cap. Detonation cord will initiate most commercial high explosives (dynamite, gelignite, sensitised gels, etc.) but will not initiate less sensitive blasting agents like ANFO on its own. 25 to 50 grain/foot (5.3 to 10.6 g/m) detonation cord has approximately the same initiating power as a #8 blasting cap in every 2 to 4 inches (5 to 10 cm) along its entire length. A small charge of PETN, TNT, or other explosive booster is required to bridge between the cord and a charge of insensitive blasting agent like ANFO or most water gels.

== Rating ==
Detonating cord is rated in explosive mass per unit length. This is expressed in grains per foot in the United States, or in grams per metre elsewhere. A "grams per metre" rating will be roughly one fifth the "grains per foot" rating. For example, "50 grain det. cord" refers to detonating cord which has 50 grains of explosive per foot of length—or approximately 10 g/m. This is a typical "default" rating for connecting charges for blasting; lighter detonating cords may be used for "low noise blasting" and movie special effects, while heavier cords, used where the cord is employed to have some direct explosive effect—such as for precision rock carving work—may use 50 to 250 grain/foot (10 to 50 g/m) detonating cord.

== Direct employment ==
Low-yield detonating cord can be used as a precision cutting charge to remove cables, pipes, wiring, fiber optics, and other utility bundles by placing one or more complete wraps around the target. Detonation cord is used in commercial boilers to break up clinkers (solidified coal ash slag) adhering to tube structures. Also a vertical centered cord being lowered into the water of a drilled well can remove any clogging that obstructs water flow. Higher-yield detonating cord can be used to cut down small trees, although the process is very uneconomical compared to using bulk explosive, or even a chainsaw. High-yield detonating cord placed by divers has been used to remove old dock pilings and other underwater obstructions.

Creating a slipknot from detonating cord yields a field-improvised device that can be quickly employed to cut a locked doorknob off a door. Detonation cord can be taped in several rings to the outline of a military man-sized target and detonated, breaching a man-sized hole into wooden doors or light interior walls. Detonating cord is also employed directly in building demolition where thin concrete slabs need be broken via channels drilled parallel to the surface, an advantage over dynamite since a lower minimum of explosive force may be used and smaller diameter holes are sufficient to contain the explosive. Anything much more substantial than these uses requires the use of additional explosives.

== Colloquialisms ==
In Filipino, the corresponding word mitsa has come to be used in the phrase mitsa ng buhay, which translates to "detonating cord of [one's] life", a metaphor for something that is very likely to cause one's death via direct jeopardy (e.g. extreme sports, versus smoking).

== See also ==
- Shock tube detonator - another type of tubular explosive detonation system with a very light loading of explosive and no direct blasting effect
