= Lime Street fire =

Deadly 1990 conflagration in Jacksonville, Florida

- Date: October 16, 1990
- Location: Jacksonville, Florida; 30.3221°N 81.6841°W
- Type: Fire
- Deaths: 6

The Lime Street fire refers to both a deadly 1990 conflagration at a residence in Jacksonville, Florida, and to the resultant investigation that restaged a similar fire in a nearby building.

Six people, including two women (one who was pregnant) and four young children, were trapped inside the house and killed. Gerald Lewis, who escaped the fire with his three-year-old son, was initially charged with arson, manslaughter, and six counts of first-degree murder, the last of which could have garnered a death sentence. After a large-scale recreation was staged in an abandoned house near the original site, it was proven that accelerant was not necessary to create long-believed classic signs of arson such as pour patterns. The charges against Lewis were dropped, and the Lime Street fire has since become a seminal case in contemporary fire investigation.

The podcast Criminal produced an episode about the fire and subsequent investigation, "527 Lime Street."

== Original fire ==
In the early hours of October 16, 1990, a fire broke out at the residence located at 527 Lime Street in downtown Jacksonville, Florida. The two-story, wood-framed house quickly became engulfed in flames. Eight people were inside the house when the fire began. When the first officer arrived, he found 35-year-old Gerald Wayne Lewis standing in the front yard, holding his young son Geramiah; six people—including Lewis' wife, her pregnant sister, and the sister's four young children—remained trapped inside.

== Investigation ==
John Lentini, a private fire investigator with Applied Technical Services of Marietta, Georgia, was asked by the prosecution to investigate the manner of the fire in order to prove Lewis' guilt. Lentini initially reviewed the chemical analysis conducted by a Florida Fire Marshal's chemist, and found his determination of gasoline to be incorrect. Prosecutors then asked for a detailed examination of the findings of the Jacksonville fire investigator, Ray Powell. Lentini suggested recreating the fire. Wanting to stage a faithful recreation, he gained permission to set fire to a condemned house next door to the one that had burned down. The second house was nearly identical to the original, having been built at the same time by the same builder, with an identical floor plan. Lentini and his associates carefully staged the house in order to recreate the original house's furnishings; they "obtained a duplicate of the couch where the defendant said the fire started", "resurfaced the entire living room and hallway with the same 3/8" sheetrock found in the suspect's house", "carpeted with the same kind of carpet, wallpapered the living room walls, and used curtains of a similar type." The team set fire to the couch, without the use of accelerant. Despite their belief that it would take 15 to 20 minutes for flashover to occur, the house became engulfed in flames in only four minutes.

After the blaze died down, investigators noted the remains bore similarities to what was present after the original fire. Streaks on the floor called "pour patterns", which were often used as proof of accelerant usage, were seen in the second house as well.

Lentini was scheduled to give testimony on behalf of the prosecution. However, after coming to the conclusion that similar conditions were caused in nearly identical fires, arson by way of accelerant could not be proven. Lentini would later state that he was changed by this discovery, "I had come within 24 hours of giving testimony that could well have sent an innocent person to Florida's electric chair. Needless to say, I was chastened by the experience. My professional life was never the same again."

Lentini created a one-hour video describing his investigations and the lessons learned.

== Legacy ==
The fire and resulting investigation has been credited with changing the way arson investigations are held. The case was used as a precedent in the Australian acquittal on appeal of a person previously convicted of arson.

== Footnotes ==
=== Works cited ===
- Folio Weekly staff (2010). "Nightmare on Lime Street: How a Ghastly Jacksonville Fire Forever Changed Arson Science in America" (PDF). Folio Weekly (15). Archived from the original (PDF) on March 6, 2020.
- Lentini, John J. (1992). "The Lime Street Fire: Another Perspective" (PDF). Fire Scientist.
- Lentini, John J. (2010). "Fire Expert: How I Nearly an Sent an Innocent Man to the Electric Chair". ABC.
- Russell, Sue (2006). "Down in Flames: 'Rock Solid' Evidence for Arson Turns Out to be Anything But". New Scientist.

=== General references ===
- Grann, David. (September 7, 2009). "Trial By Fire". The New Yorker. Retrieved January 12, 2012.
