= Gerald Hurst =

American chemist & fire investigator (1937–2015)

- Born: June 16, 1937; Davis, Oklahoma
- Died: March 11, 2015 (aged 77); Austin, Texas
- Other name: Jerry
- Education: University of Cambridge
- Known for: Arson investigations
- Scientific career
- Fields: Chemistry

Gerald "Jerry" Hurst (June 16, 1937 – March 11, 2015) was an American chemist and fire investigator. Before becoming noted for arson investigations, Hurst designed explosives for warfare, invented a binary explosive device known as Kinepak and developed an improved chemical compound to create Liquid Paper. He also devised an explosive called Astrolite as well as the Mylar balloon.

Hurst provided consultation or expert testimony in several high-profile arson cases, including that of executed Texas death row inmate Cameron Todd Willingham. His work also led to the parole of convicted arsonist Sonia Cacy and the release of Ernest Ray Willis, who had spent 17 years on death row in Texas.

== Biography ==
=== Early life ===
Hurst was born in Davis, Oklahoma. He grew up between Oklahoma and California since his parents, a sharecropper and a waitress, were divorced. He earned a doctorate from the University of Cambridge. He worked to develop explosives for use in warfare and he made rocket propellant for Harshaw Chemical. After leaving Harshaw Chemical, he invented Kinepak, a special explosive that does not detonate until its components mix together. His business was bought out and merged with the Atlas Powder Company.

=== Atlas Powder Company ===
Hurst served as chief scientist with Atlas. He worked about ten hours per week in the Atlas laboratory in Austin, Texas, and he spent much of the rest of his time as a consultant on civil court cases. Those cases often involved legal disputes over the causes of fires.

Hurst made other scientific discoveries, including the mylar balloon and an improved version of Liquid Paper. He said that he earned a great deal of money from inventing the Mylar balloon but that much of it had gone to patent lawyers. When he came up with the idea to use Mylar sheets to make balloons of different shapes, he protected that innovation as a trade secret rather than pursuing another patent. He also developed an exploding T-shirt and a very powerful explosive known as Astrolite.

After developing liver failure and becoming very ill, Hurst received a liver transplant in 1994. His liver condition was thought to have been precipitated by his research work with toxic chemicals.

=== Sonia Cacy and Ernest Ray Willis cases ===
In 1996, he was contacted in reference to the arson case of Sonia Cacy, who had been found guilty and sentenced to 55 years in prison. In a resentencing trial for Cacy, Hurst testified on her behalf, but she was resentenced to 99 years in prison. He helped to bring attention to Cacy's case and he presented evidence on her behalf before a parole board. Faced with Hurst's evidence, the board decided to release Cacy in 1998 after six years in prison.

An article in Texas Monthly described the impact of Hurst's work, saying, "If there was a moment when fire investigation began to emerge out of the dark age of hunches, untested hand-me-down arson indicators, and wives' tales, it occurred when Hurst turned his attention to Cacy's case."

Hurst began to provide pro bono testimony in several arson cases which he believed a determination of arson might have been based on flawed investigations. He worked on the case of Ernest Ray Willis, a Texas man sentenced to death in 1987 after a fire killed two women. Hurst discovered that the fire had not been a case of arson. Willis was released from death row in 2004.

=== Forensic Files episodes ===
He appeared in two Forensic Files episodes: "Fire Dot Com" (Season 6, Episode 6; charges were dismissed against Terri Strickland) and "Plastic Fire" (Season 7, Episode 41; conviction overturned against Sheila Bryan).

=== Cameron Todd Willingham case ===
In 2004, Hurst was asked to review the case of Texas death row inmate Cameron Todd Willingham, who was sentenced to death after a fire in which his three children died. By that time, Hurst's work had contributed to ten exonerations. Hurst was contacted only a couple of weeks before Willingham's scheduled execution. He issued a report in which he criticized the conclusions of the original fire investigators in light of more current fire investigation knowledge. Hurst said that the fire had not been a case of arson. Hurst's report was faxed to the office of Texas governor Rick Perry on the day that Willingham was scheduled to die. However, the execution proceeded because Perry was unconvinced that the report provided a basis for a stay of execution.

In 2006, the Innocence Project brought together a group of arson experts to review the Willingham case. The panel agreed with Hurst's conclusions. A 2009 review by the Texas Forensic Science Commission found that the original arson determination had been made using "flawed science". Hurst was featured in Incendiary, a documentary film on the Willingham case.

=== Death ===
Hurst died in March 2015 of complications from a liver transplant he had received in 1994.

== See also ==
- Fire investigation
