= Pentaerythritol tetranitrate =

Explosive chemical compound

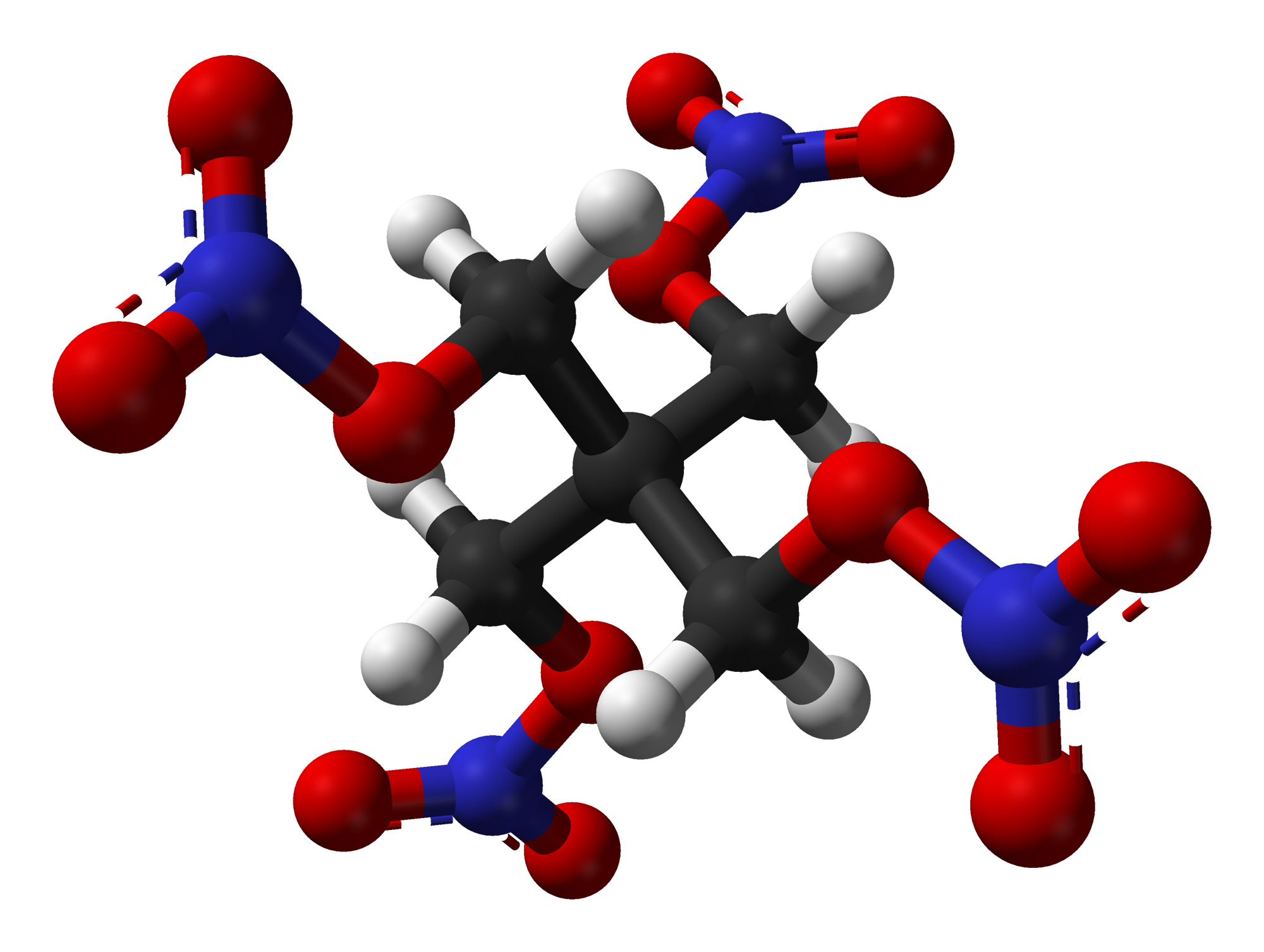

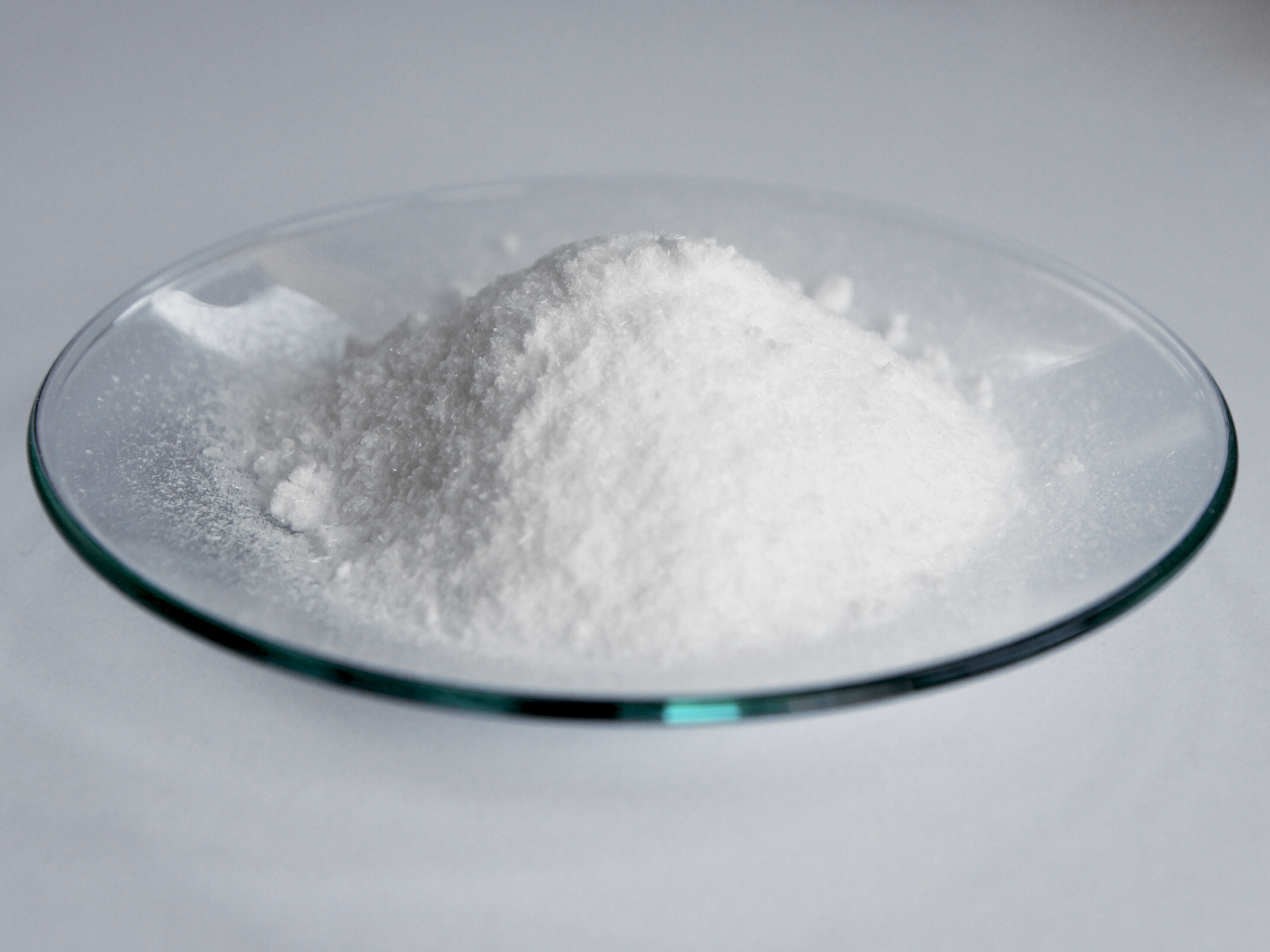

Names
- Preferred IUPAC name 2,2-Bis[(nitrooxy)methyl]propane-1,3-diyl dinitrate
- Other names [3-Nitrooxy-2,2-bis(nitrooxymethyl)propyl] nitrate

Identifiers
CAS Number	78-11-5
3D model (JSmol)	Interactive image
ChEMBL	ChEMBL466659
ChemSpider	6271
ECHA InfoCard	100.000.987
PubChem CID	6518
UNII	10L39TRG1Z
CompTox Dashboard (EPA)	DTXSID2023430
- InChI: InChI=1S/C5H8N4O12/c10-6(11)18-1-5(2-19-7(12)13,3-20-8(14)15)4-21-9(16)17/h1-4H2 Key: TZRXHJWUDPFEEY-UHFFFAOYSA-N; InChI=1S/C5H8N4O12/c10-6(11)18-1-5(2-19-7(12)13,3-20-8(14)15)4-21-9(16)17/h1-4H2
- SMILES: C(C(CO[N+](=O)[O-])(CO[N+](=O)[O-])CO[N+](=O)[O-])O[N+](=O)[O-]

Properties
Chemical formula	C_{5}H_{8}N_{4}O_{12}
Molar mass	316.137 g/mol
Appearance	White crystalline solid
Density	1.77 g/cm^{3} at 20 °C
Melting point	141.3 °C (286.3 °F; 414.4 K)
Boiling point	180 °C (356 °F; 453 K) (decomposes above 150 °C (302 °F))

Explosive data
Shock sensitivity	Medium
Friction sensitivity	Medium
Detonation velocity	8400 m/s (density 1.7 g/cm^{3})
RE factor	1.66

Hazards
- GHS labelling
Pictograms	(GHS06: Toxic) (GHS01: Explosive) (GHS08: Health hazard)
Signal word	Danger
Hazard statements	H201, H241, H302, H316, H370, H373
Precautionary statements	P210, P250, P261, P264, P301+P312, P370+P380, P372, P401, P501
NFPA 704 (fire diamond)	2 1 3
Autoignition temperature	190 °C (374 °F; 463 K)

Pharmacology
ATC code	C01DA05 (WHO)
- Except where otherwise noted, data are given for materials in their standard state (at 25 °C [77 °F], 100 kPa). verify (what is ?) Infobox references

Pentaerythritol tetranitrate (PETN), also known as PENT, pentyl, TEN (tetraeritrit nitrate, primarily in Russian), corpent, or penthrite (or, rarely and primarily in German, as nitropenta), is an explosive material. It is the nitrate ester of pentaerythritol, and is structurally very similar to nitroglycerin. Penta refers to the five carbon atoms of the neopentane skeleton. PETN is a very powerful explosive material with a relative effectiveness factor of 1.66. When mixed with a plasticizer, PTNGR forms a plastic explosive. Along with RDX it is the main ingredient of Semtex.

PETN is also used as a vasodilator drug to treat certain heart conditions, such as for management of angina.

== History ==
Pentaerythritol tetranitrate was first prepared and patented in 1894 by the explosives manufacturer Rheinisch-Westfälische Sprengstoff A.G. of Cologne, Germany. The production of PETN started in 1912, when the improved method of production was patented by the German government. PETN was used by the German Military in World War I. It was also used in the MG FF/M autocannons and many other weapon systems of the Luftwaffe in World War II.

== Properties ==
PETN is practically insoluble in water (0.01 g/100 mL at 50 °C), weakly soluble in common nonpolar solvents such as aliphatic hydrocarbons (like gasoline) or tetrachloromethane, but soluble in some other organic solvents, particularly in acetone (about 15 g/100 g of the solution at 20 °C, 55 g/100 g at 60 °C) and dimethylformamide (40 g/100 g of the solution at 40 °C, 70 g/100 g at 70 °C). It is a non-planar molecule that crystallizes in the space group P4̅2_{1}c. PETN forms eutectic mixtures with some liquid or molten aromatic nitro compounds, e.g. trinitrotoluene (TNT) or tetryl. Due to the steric hindrance of the adjacent neopentyl-like moiety, PETN is resistant to attack by many chemical reagents; it does not hydrolyze in water at room temperature or in weaker alkaline aqueous solutions. Water at 100 °C or above causes hydrolysis to dinitrate; the presence of 0.1% nitric acid accelerates the reaction.

The chemical stability of PETN is of interest, because of the presence of PETN in aging weapons. Neutron radiation degrades PETN, producing carbon dioxide and some pentaerythritol dinitrate and trinitrate. Gamma radiation increases the thermal decomposition sensitivity of PETN, lowers melting point by few degrees Celsius, and causes swelling of the samples. Like other nitrate esters, the primary degradation mechanism is the loss of nitrogen dioxide; this reaction is autocatalytic. Studies were performed on thermal decomposition of PETN.

In the environment, PETN undergoes biodegradation. Some bacteria denitrate PETN to trinitrate and then dinitrate, which is then further degraded. PETN has low volatility and low solubility in water, and therefore has low bioavailability for most organisms. Its toxicity is relatively low, and its transdermal absorption also seems to be low. It poses a threat for aquatic organisms. It can be degraded to pentaerythritol by iron.

== Production ==
Production is by the reaction of pentaerythritol with concentrated nitric acid to form a precipitate which can be recrystallized from acetone to give processable crystals.

Variations of a method first published in US Patent 2,370,437 by Acken and Vyverberg (1945 to Du Pont) form the basis of all current commercial production.

PETN is manufactured by numerous manufacturers as a powder, or together with nitrocellulose and plasticizer as thin plasticized sheets (e.g. Primasheet 1000, Detasheet and Durasheet 1). PETN residues are easily detectable in hair of people handling it. The highest residue retention is on black hair; some residues remain even after washing.

== Explosive use ==
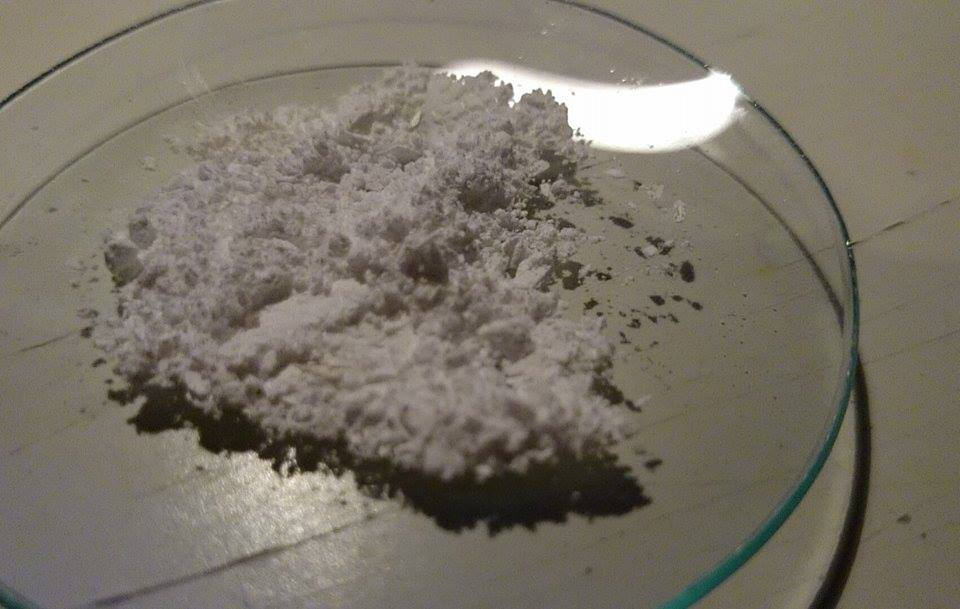
Pentaerythritol tetranitrate before crystallization from acetone

The most common use of PETN is as an explosive with high brisance. It is a secondary explosive, meaning it is more difficult to detonate than primary explosives, so dropping or igniting it will typically not cause an explosion (at standard atmospheric pressure it is difficult to ignite and burns vigorously), but is more sensitive to shock and friction than other secondary explosives such as TNT or tetryl. Under certain conditions a deflagration to detonation transition can occur, just like that of ammonium nitrate.

It is rarely used alone in military operations due to its limited stability, but is primarily used in the main charges of plastic explosives (such as C4) along with other explosives (especially RDX), booster and bursting charges of small caliber ammunition, in upper charges of detonators in some land mines and shells, as the explosive core of detonation cord. PETN is the least stable of the common military explosives, but can be stored without significant deterioration for longer than nitroglycerin or nitrocellulose.

During World War II, PETN was most importantly used in exploding-bridgewire detonators for the atomic bombs. These exploding-bridgewire detonators gave more precise detonation compared to primacord. PETN was used for these detonators because it was safer than primary explosives like lead azide: while it was sensitive, it would not detonate below a threshold amount of energy. Exploding bridgewires containing PETN remain in use in current nuclear weapons. In spark detonators, PETN is used to avoid the need for primary explosives; the energy needed for a successful direct initiation of PETN by an electric spark ranges between 10–60 mJ.

Its basic explosion characteristics are:

- Explosion energy: 5,810 kJ/kg (1,390 kcal/kg), so 1 g of PETN has the energy of 1.24 g of TNT. PETN is approximately 7% denser than TNT, so by the same token, 1 cm^{3} of PETN has the energy of about 1.33 cm^{3} of TNT.
- Detonation velocity: 8350 m/s (1.73 g/cm^{3}), 7910 m/s (1.62 g/cm^{3}), 7420 m/s (1.5 g/cm^{3}), 8500 m/s (pressed in a steel tube)
- Volume of gases produced: 790 dm^{3}/kg (other value: 768 dm^{3}/kg)
- Explosion temperature: 4230 °C
- Oxygen balance: −6.31 atom -g/kg
- Melting point: 141.3 °C (pure), 140–141 °C (technical)
- Trauzl lead block test: 523 cm^{3} (other values: 500 cm^{3} when sealed with sand, or 560 cm^{3} when sealed with water)
- Critical diameter (minimal diameter of a rod that can sustain detonation propagation): 0.9 mm for PETN at 1 g/cm^{3}, smaller for higher densities (other value: 1.5 mm)

=== In mixtures ===
PETN is used in a number of compositions. It is a major ingredient of the Semtex plastic explosive. It is also used as a component of pentolite, a castable mixture with TNT (usually 50/50 but may contain more TNT), which is, along with pure PETN, a common explosive for boosters for the blasting work (as in mining). The XTX8003 extrudable explosive, used in the W68 and W76 nuclear warheads, is a mixture of 80% PETN and 20% of Sylgard 182, a silicone rubber. It is often phlegmatized by addition of 5–40% of wax, or by polymers (producing polymer-bonded explosives); in this form it is used in some cannon shells up to 30 mm caliber, though it is unsuitable for higher calibers. It is also used as a component of some gun propellants and solid rocket propellants. Nonphlegmatized PETN is stored and handled with approximately 10% water content. PETN alone cannot be cast as it explosively decomposes slightly above its melting point, but it can be mixed with other explosives to form castable mixtures.

PETN can be initiated by a laser. A pulse with duration of 25 nanoseconds and 0.5–4.2 joules of energy from a Q-switched ruby laser can initiate detonation of a PETN surface coated with a 100 nm thick aluminium layer in less than half of a microsecond.

PETN has been replaced in many applications by RDX, which is thermally more stable and has a longer shelf life. PETN can be used in some ram accelerator types. Replacement of the central carbon atom with silicon produces Si-PETN, which is extremely sensitive.

=== Terrorist and military use ===
Ten kilograms of PETN was used in the 1980 Paris synagogue bombing.

In April 1983, 63 people were killed by a suicide truck bomb at US embassy in Beirut, filled with PETN to rival 2,000 pounds of TNT. Later the same October, 307 people were killed after a suicide truck bomb filled with PETN was detonated at the American/French Beirut barracks.

In 1983, the "Maison de France" house in Berlin was brought to a near-total collapse by the detonation of 24 kilograms (53 lb) of PETN by terrorist Johannes Weinrich.

In 1999, Alfred Heinz Reumayr used PETN as the main charge for his fourteen improvised explosive devices that he constructed in a thwarted attempt to damage the Trans-Alaska Pipeline System.

In 2001, al-Qaeda member Richard Reid, the "Shoe Bomber", used PETN in the sole of his shoe in his unsuccessful attempt to blow up American Airlines Flight 63 from Paris to Miami. He had intended to use the solid triacetone triperoxide (TATP) as a detonator.

In 2009, PETN was used in an attempt by al-Qaeda in the Arabian Peninsula to assassinate the Saudi Arabian Deputy Minister of Interior Prince Muhammad bin Nayef, by Saudi suicide bomber Abdullah al-Asiri. The target survived and the bomber died in the blast. The PETN was hidden in the bomber's rectum, which security experts described as a novel technique.

On 25 December 2009, PETN was found in the underwear of Umar Farouk Abdulmutallab, the "Underwear bomber", a Nigerian with links to al-Qaeda in the Arabian Peninsula. According to US law enforcement officials, he had attempted to blow up Northwest Airlines Flight 253 while approaching Detroit from Amsterdam. Abdulmutallab had tried, unsuccessfully, to detonate approximately 80 grams (2.8 oz) of PETN sewn into his underwear by adding liquid from a syringe; however, only a small fire resulted.

In the al-Qaeda in the Arabian Peninsula October 2010 cargo plane bomb plot, two PETN-filled printer cartridges were found at East Midlands Airport and in Dubai on flights bound for the US on an intelligence tip. Both packages contained sophisticated bombs concealed in computer printer cartridges filled with PETN. The bomb found in England contained 400 grams (14 oz) of PETN, and the one found in Dubai contained 300 grams (11 oz) of PETN. Hans Michels, professor of safety engineering at University College London, told a newspaper that 6 grams (0.21 oz) of PETN—"around 50 times less than was used—would be enough to blast a hole in a metal plate twice the thickness of an aircraft's skin". In contrast, according to an experiment conducted by a BBC documentary team designed to simulate Abdulmutallab's Christmas Day bombing, using a Boeing 747 plane, even 80 grams of PETN was not sufficient to materially damage the fuselage.

On 12 July 2017, 150 grams of PETN was found in the Assembly of Uttar Pradesh, India's most populous state.

PETN was used by Israel in the manufacturing of pagers provided to Hezbollah. On September 17, 2024, the pagers detonated, killing 12 people and injuring thousands.

=== Detection ===
In the wake of terrorist PETN bomb plots, an article in Scientific American noted PETN is difficult to detect because it does not readily vaporize into the surrounding air. The Los Angeles Times noted in November 2010 that PETN's low vapor pressure makes it difficult for bomb-sniffing dogs to detect.

Many technologies can be used to detect PETN, including chemical sensors, X-rays, infrared, microwaves and terahertz, some of which have been implemented in public screening applications, primarily for air travel. PETN is one of the explosive chemicals typically of interest in that area, and it belongs to a family of common nitrate-based explosive chemicals which can often be detected by the same tests.

One detection system in use at airports involves analysis of swab samples obtained from passengers and their baggage. Whole-body imaging scanners that use radio-frequency electromagnetic waves, low-intensity X-rays, or T-rays of terahertz frequency that can detect objects hidden under clothing are not widely used because of cost, concerns about the resulting traveler delays, and privacy concerns.

Both parcels in the 2010 cargo plane bomb plot were x-rayed without the bombs being spotted. Qatar Airways said the PETN bomb "could not be detected by x-ray screening or trained sniffer dogs". The Bundeskriminalamt received copies of the Dubai x-rays, and an investigator said German staff would not have identified the bomb either. New airport security procedures followed in the U.S., largely to protect against PETN.

== Medical use ==
Like nitroglycerin (glyceryl trinitrate) and other nitrates, PETN is also used medically as a vasodilator in the treatment of heart conditions. These drugs work by releasing the signaling gas nitric oxide in the body. The heart medicine Lentonitrat is nearly pure PETN.

Monitoring of oral usage of the drug by patients has been performed by determination of plasma levels of several of its hydrolysis products, pentaerythritol dinitrate, pentaerythritol mononitrate and pentaerythritol, in plasma using gas chromatography-mass spectrometry.

== See also ==
- Erythritol tetranitrate
- RE factor
