= Texas Forensic Science Commission =

The Texas Forensic Science Commission (FSC) is a state agency of Texas, headquartered on the grounds of the College of Criminal Justice of Sam Houston State University in Huntsville. The commission investigates complaints about misuse or neglect regarding crime laboratories.

House Bill 1068, authored by Texas Senate members Juan "Chuy" Hinojosa and John Whitmire and Texas House of Representatives member Joe Driver, added 38.01 Texas Forensic Science Commission ("FSC"), specifying the establishment of the agency. 1068 was passed during the 2005 Legislative Session. In 2007 the FSC funds were appropriated to Sam Houston State.

== History ==
On July 23, 2010, the Texas Forensic Science Commission released a report saying that the conviction of Cameron Todd Willingham was based on "flawed science" but did not find sufficient evidence to indicate that the arson investigators were negligent or committed willful misconduct.
