= Manchester bombing =

Manchester bombing or Manchester attack may refer to:

- Manchester Blitz during World War II
- 1975 bombing of Lewis's by the Provisional IRA
- 1992 Manchester bombing by the Provisional IRA: two small bombs
- 1996 Manchester bombing by the Provisional IRA: a lorry bomb, causing extensive damage
- Manchester Arena bombing by an Islamic extremist in 2017
- 2025 Manchester synagogue attack involving a vehicle ramming and stabbing
