= List of terrorist incidents in 1996 =

This is a timeline of incidents in 1996 that have been labelled as "terrorism" and are not believed to have been carried out by a government or its forces (see state terrorism and state-sponsored terrorism).

== Guidelines ==
- To be included, entries must be notable (have a stand-alone article) and described by a consensus of reliable sources as "terrorism".
- List entries must comply with the guidelines outlined in the manual of style under MOS:TERRORIST.
- Casualties figures in this list are the total casualties of the incident including immediate casualties and later casualties (such as people who succumbed to their wounds long after the attacks occurred).
- Casualties listed are the victims. Perpetrator casualties are listed separately (e.g. x (+y) indicate that x victims and y perpetrators were killed/injured).
- Casualty totals may be underestimated or unavailable due to a lack of information. A figure with a plus (+) sign indicates that at least that many people have died (e.g. 10+ indicates that at least 10 people have died) – the actual toll could be considerably higher. A figure with a plus (+) sign may also indicate that over that number of people are victims.
- If casualty figures are 20 or more, they will be shown in **bold**. In addition, figures for casualties more than 50 will also be **underlined**.
- Incidents are limited to one per location per day. If multiple attacks occur in the same place on the same day, they will be merged into a single incident.
- In addition to the guidelines above, the table also includes the following categories:

0 people were killed/injured by the incident.
1–19 people were killed/injured by the incident.
20–49 people were killed/injured by the incident.
50–99 people were killed/injured by the incident.
100+ people were killed/injured by the incident.

== List ==
Date	Type	Dead	Injured	Location	Details	Perpetrators	Part of
9-18 January	Hostage-taking	200+		Dagestan, Russia	Kizlyar-Pervomayskoye hostage crisis: Around 200 Chechen rebels raided an air base near Kizlyar and took thousands of civilians hostage. The events concluded in a battle between the Chechens and Russian Army in the village of Pervomayskoye that resulted in the deaths of around 200 Russian soldiers, 96 Chechen rebels and at least 26 civilians.	CRI	First Chechen War
16-19 January	Hostage-taking	0	13	Black Sea	Black Sea hostage crisis: Chechen rebels took over the ferry MV Avrasya and held the 232 passengers and crew hostage for 3 days before releasing them.	CRI	First Chechen War
31 January	Suicide bombing	91	1400	Colombo, Sri Lanka	Colombo Central Bank bombing: An attack by the LTTE on the Central Bank killed 91 and injured a further 1,400 civilians, damaging other buildings in the process. It was the most deadly LTTE attack on a civilian target in the history of the group's operations.	LTTE	Sri Lankan Civil War
9 February	Truck bombing	2	200	London, United Kingdom	1996 Docklands bombing: The Provisional Irish Republican Army detonated a massive truck bomb in the Canary Wharf financial district.	PIRA	The Troubles
14 March	Firebombing	7	?	Sitra, Bahrain	1996 Sitra attack: Five terrorists throw petrol bombs into a restaurant, killing seven Bangladeshi workers.	DFLP	1990s uprising in Bahrain
16 April	Ambush	53-100	Dozens	Yaryshmardy, Russia	Shatoy ambush: Chechen rebels led by Ibn al-Khattab ambushed and massacres a battalion of Russian soldiers.	CRI	First Chechen War
18 April	Mass shooting	18		Cairo, Egypt	1996 Cairo shooting: 18 people were killed when Islamist gunmen fired on Greek tourists outside the Europa hotel.	Islamists	
15 June	Van bombing	0	212	Manchester, United Kingdom	1996 Manchester bombing: The PIRA parked a van containing an enormous bomb in the city centre and phoned a warning to police. The bomb, the largest to explode in Britain since World War II, caused extensive damage. But despite injuring 212 people, the bomb did not kill anyone as the area had been evacuated, although a bomb squad failed to defuse the bomb.	PIRA	The Troubles
16 June	Massacre	35-43	Unknown	La Gabarra, Tibú, Colombia	La Gabarra massacre: A massacre was perpetrated by members of the United Self-Defense Forces of Colombia (AUC paramilitary group) against alleged members of FARC, killing 35-43 people.	Autodefensas Unidas de Colombia	Colombian conflict
25 June	Truck bombing	19	498	Khobar, Saudi Arabia	Khobar Towers bombing: A truck bombing targeting an apartment complex that housed U.S. servicemen. 19 American servicemen were killed and nearly 500 people of various nationalities were injured.	Saudi Hezbollah	
28 June	Mortar attack	0	0	Osnabrück, Germany	British barracks in Osnabrück came under fire	Provisional IRA	Terrorism in Germany
30 June	Bombing	9 (+1)	29	Tunceli Province, Turkey	The 1996 Tunceli bombing was a suicide bombing targeting a group of 60 unarmed military personnel at a flag raising ceremony.	Kurdistan Workers' Party	Kurdish–Turkish conflict (1978–present)
4 July	Suicide bombing, assassination	20+	60	Jaffna, Sri Lanka	Ananda Hamangoda#LTTE suicide bombing: At least 20 people, including Brigade 51-2 Commanding Officer Ananda Hamangoda, were killed in a suicide bombing.	LTTE	Sri Lankan Civil War
24 July	Bombing	64	400	Dehiwala, Sri Lanka	1996 Dehiwala train bombing: The LTTE detonated 4 bombs on Colombo-Alutgama train, killing 64 civilians and injuring 400 others.	LTTE	Sri Lankan Civil War
27 July	Bombing	2	111	Atlanta, United States	Centennial Olympic Park bombing: Army of God member Eric Robert Rudolph detonated a pipe bomb at Centennial Olympic Park to try to cancel the 1996 Summer Olympics due to his anger at the U.S. government allowing abortion.	Eric Robert Rudolph; AOG	
10 November	Bombing	13	30	Moscow, Russia	Kotlyakovskoya Cemetery bombing: A bomb exploded at a cemetery during a funeral for the president of the Soviet-Afghan war veterans group who had been murdered. The group had ties to organized crime. The assailants were two former members of the group who had formed a splinter group.	Andrei Anohin; Mikhail Smurov	
3 December	Bombing	4	170	Paris, France	1996 Paris Métro bombing: A bomb exploded at the Port-Royal-des-Champs Abbey metro station.	GIA	Algerian Civil War
17 December	Massacre, invasion	7	1	Novye Atagi, Russia	ICRC Hospital of Novye Atagi#The massacre: Five to ten Chechen separatists broke into an ICRC hospital and murdered 6 six nurses and an engineer, all foreign nationals. The head of the hospital was seriously wounded.	CRI	First Chechen War
30 December	Bombing	33+		Western Assam, India	Brahmaputra Mail train bombing: Assamese nationalists bombed a Brahmaputra Mail train. The railway the train was on was also used by military trains, which may have been the militants targets.	NDFB	Assam conflict

== See also ==
- List of terrorist incidents
