= SQP =

SQP may refer to:

- Sequential quadratic programming, an iterative method for constrained nonlinear optimization
- South Quay Plaza, a residential-led development under construction in Canary Wharf on the Isle of Dogs, London
- SQP, the ICAO code for SkyUp, Kyiv, Ukraine
