= 1996 Docklands bombing =

Irish republican attack in London

London Docklands bombing
- Part of the Troubles
- South Quay Plaza ruined by the explosion

- 1996 Docklands bombing (London Borough of Tower Hamlets)
- Location: 51°30′02″N 00°01′05″W; South Quay station, Isle of Dogs, London
- Date: 9 February 1996; 30 years ago 19:01 (GMT)
- Target: South Quay (Enterprise Zone of London Docklands Development Corporation)
- Attack type: Truck bomb
- Deaths: 2
- Injuries: 100+
- Perpetrators: Provisional IRA; South Armagh Brigade Volunteers

On 9 February 1996, the Provisional Irish Republican Army (IRA) detonated a powerful truck bomb in South Quay, outside Canary Wharf, in London Docklands. The blast killed two people and devastated a wide area, causing an estimated £150 million worth of damage. The IRA had sent warnings 90 minutes beforehand, but the area was not fully evacuated. As well as the two people who were killed, more than 100 were injured, some permanently.

The attack marked an end to the IRA's seventeen-month ceasefire, and came just over an hour after its declaration to Irish broadcaster RTÉ. The IRA agreed to the ceasefire in August 1994 on the understanding that Sinn Féin would be allowed to take part in peace negotiations, but resumed its campaign with the Docklands bombing when the British government demanded a full IRA disarmament as a precondition for talks. After the bombing, the British government dropped its demand. A few months later, the IRA detonated another, more powerful truck bomb in Manchester.

IRA member James McArdle was convicted of the bombing in 1998. He had been a member of an IRA sniper team in South Armagh. He was released two years later, under the terms of the Good Friday Agreement.

== Background ==
The Provisional IRA's campaign began in 1969 and in 1973 spread to England, where it included many bomb attacks. As well as attacking military and political targets, it also bombed infrastructure and commercial targets. The goal was to damage the economy and cause severe disruption, which would put pressure on the British government to negotiate a withdrawal from Northern Ireland. In the early 1990s, the IRA began another major bombing campaign in England. In February 1991 it launched a mortar attack on 10 Downing Street, official residence and office of the British Prime Minister John Major. The then Prime Minister was holding a Cabinet meeting that day discussing the Gulf War. The mortars narrowly missed the building and there were no casualties. In April 1992, the IRA detonated a powerful truck bomb in the Baltic Exchange bombing in the City of London, the UK's main financial district. The blast killed three people and caused £800 million worth of damage; more than the total damage caused by all IRA bombings before it. In November 1992, the IRA planted a large van bomb at Canary Wharf, London's second financial district. However, security guards immediately alerted the police and the bomb was defused. In April 1993, the IRA detonated another powerful truck bomb in the City of London. It killed one person and caused £500 million worth of damage.

In December 1993 the British and Irish governments issued the Downing Street Declaration. It allowed Sinn Féin, the political party associated with the IRA, to participate in all-party peace negotiations on condition that the IRA called a ceasefire. The IRA called a ceasefire on 31 August 1994. Over the next seventeen months there were a number of meetings between representatives of the British government and Sinn Féin. There were also talks—among representatives of the British and Irish governments and the Northern Ireland parties—about how all-party peace negotiations could take place.

By 1996, John Major's government had lost its majority in the British parliament and was depending on Ulster unionist votes to stay in power. Irish nationalists accused it of pro-unionist bias as a result. The British government began insisting that the IRA must fully disarm before Sinn Féin would be allowed to take part in full-fledged peace talks. It argued that the IRA could use violence, or the threat of violence, to influence negotiations. The IRA rejected this demand, seeing it as a demand for total surrender. Sinn Féin said that the IRA would not disarm before talks, but that it would discuss disarmament as part of an overall solution. On 23 January 1996, the international commission for disarmament in Northern Ireland recommended that Britain drop its demand, suggesting that disarmament begin during talks rather than before. The British government refused to drop its demand. Responding to the commission, Major said in parliament that, for there to be talks, either the IRA would have to disarm or there would have to be an election in Northern Ireland. Irish republicans and nationalists wanted talks to begin swiftly, but noted that it would take months to organize and hold an election. Sinn Féin president Gerry Adams argued that the British government and unionists were erecting "one obstacle after another to frustrate every attempt to sit down around the negotiating table". Adams warned American diplomats that the British government's actions were "threatening the ceasefire".

== Planning ==
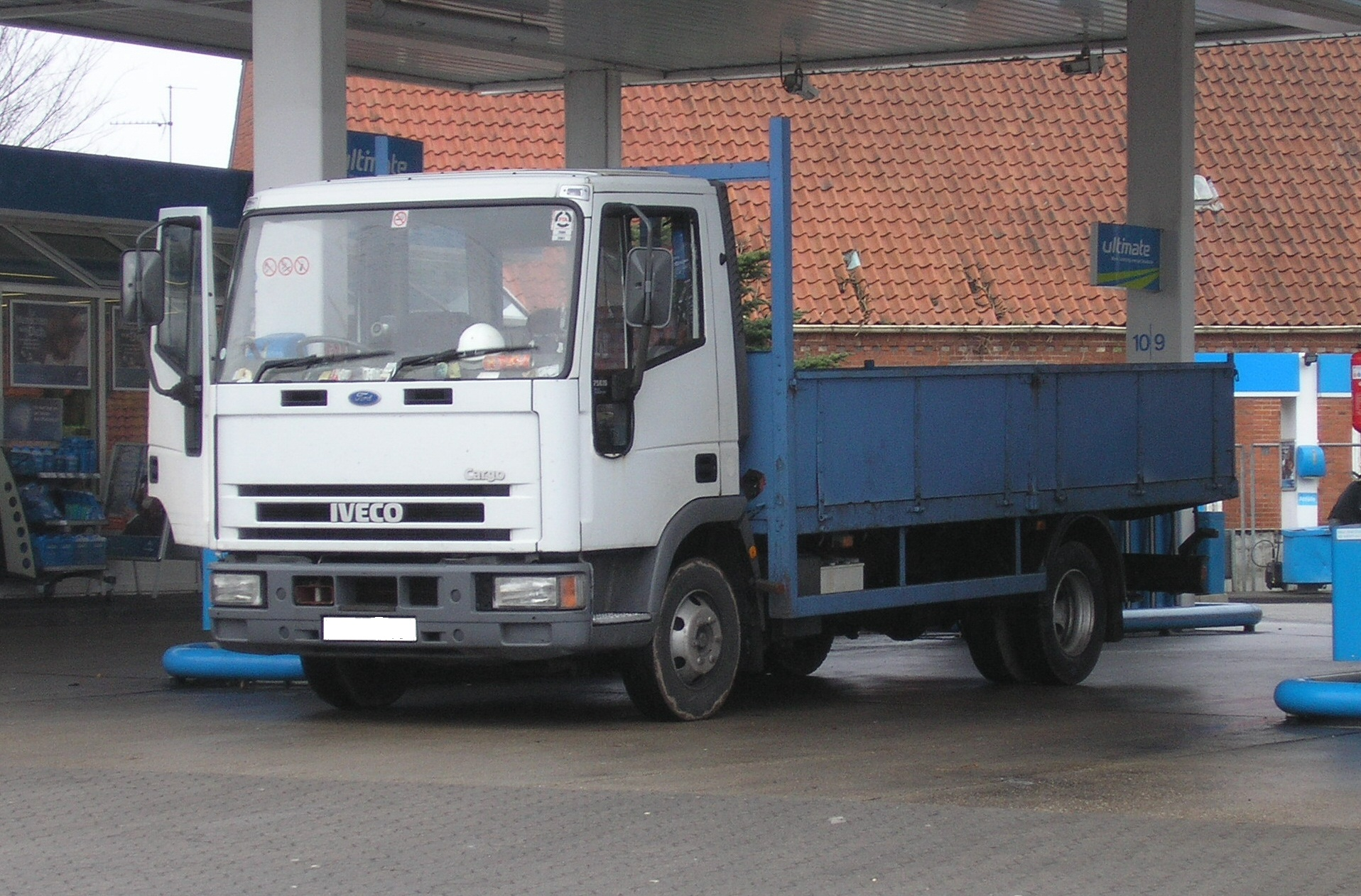
The bomb was hidden in the back of an Iveco Ford Cargo flatbed truck, which had been specially modified. (This image is an unmodified example.)

The bombing had been planned weeks beforehand. During the ceasefire the IRA had continued to make explosives, stockpile weapons and gather intelligence. The IRA's South Armagh Brigade was tasked with planning and carrying out the attack. The 3,000-pound (1,400 kg) bomb consisted of plastic sacks filled with a mix of ammonium nitrate fertilizer and sugar. These sacks were packed around 'booster tubes' consisting of metal scaffolding poles drilled with holes and stuffed with 10 lb (4.5 kg) of Semtex high explosives required to initiate the explosive train. Attached to the booster tubes were lengths of makeshift detonating cord filled with PETN and RDX, the constituent elements of Semtex. The bomb was hidden in the back of a blue Iveco Ford Cargo flatbed truck. It was modified to look like a flatbed tow truck and a compartment for the bomb was built into the back.

On 7 February, two days before the attack, the truck bomb was transported from Northern Ireland to Scotland on a Stena Line Larne–Stranraer ferry. It was then driven more than 300 miles (480 km) south to Barking in east London. There, a timer and power unit (TPU) in the cab was linked to the bomb compartment in the back. It was also fitted with a mercury switch anti-handling device, which would set off the bomb if it was tampered with. The bomb would be primed by the driver pressing a switch inside the cab, connected to a two-hour fuse. Three weeks before the attack, IRA members had carried out a 'dummy run' to familiarize themselves with the route and to test security.

== The bombing ==
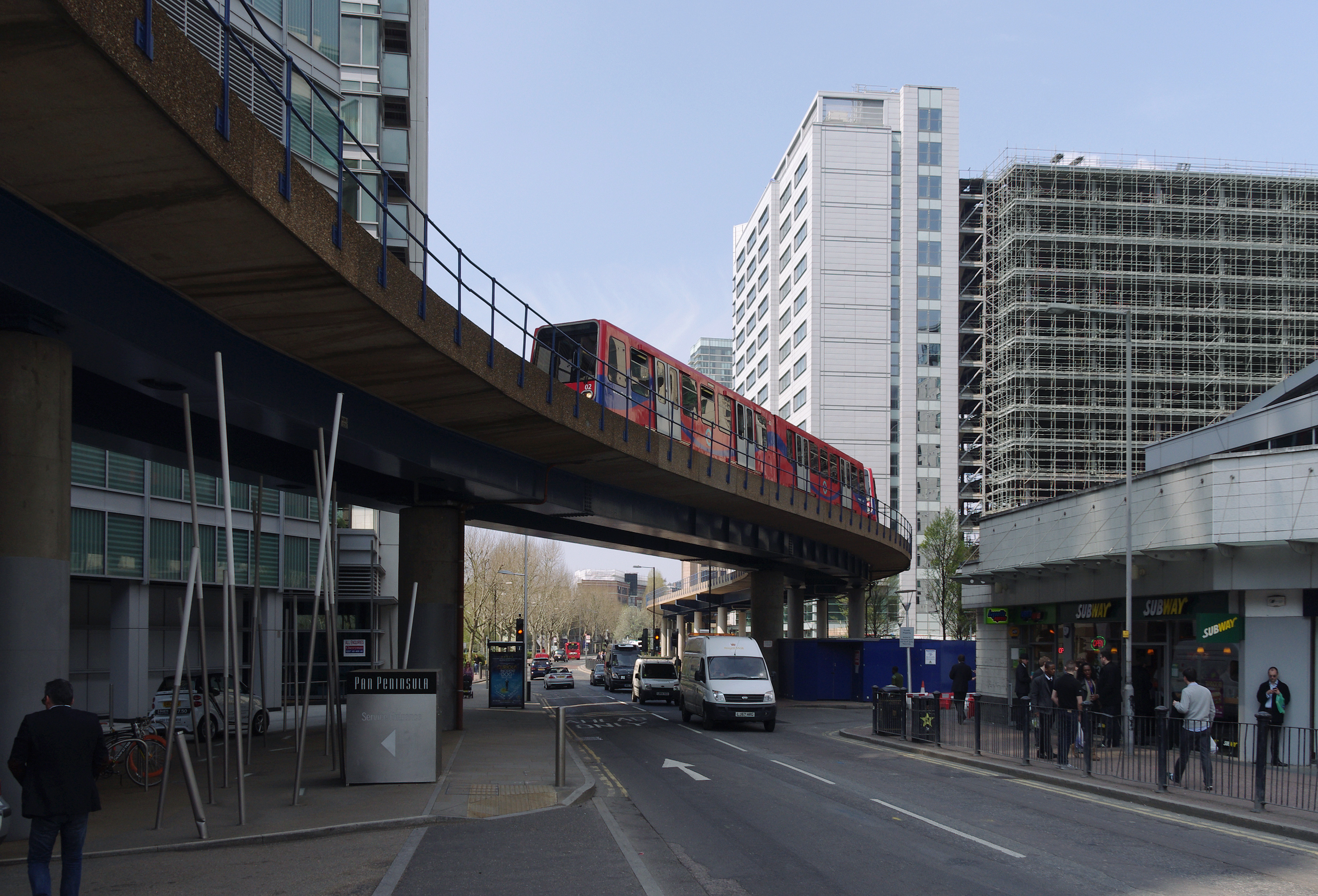
The site of the bombing (shown in 2013)

At about 5 p.m. on Friday 9 February, the truck bomb was parked in the Docklands. The Docklands was a "high-prestige" target for the IRA. It was made up of many high-rise buildings housing the offices of major banks, corporations, newspapers and television stations. It included the Canary Wharf Tower, then the tallest building in Europe. The truck was parked about 80 yards (70 m) from South Quay station on the Docklands Light Railway, near the point where the tracks cross Marsh Wall. At about 5:30 p.m., an IRA spokesman issued a statement to Irish broadcaster RTÉ, announcing that the IRA, "with great reluctance", would be ending its ceasefire at 6 p.m. However, RTÉ were sceptical and did not report the announcement on the 6 p.m. news; it would do so only minutes before the bomb detonated. Shortly after 5:30 p.m., the IRA began sending a string of at least six telephoned warnings about the bomb. They were accompanied by a secret IRA codeword, known only to the IRA and security forces, so that police would know the warning was genuine. In one of the calls, to the offices of the Irish News, the caller said "there's a massive bomb beside South Quay station, Marsh Wall, Isle of Dogs, London. Evacuate immediately".

Police officers arrived at the scene and, at about 6 p.m., they began evacuating the area around South Quay station. The officers (of whom there were at least twenty) were told to cordon off the area, clear it of vehicles and pedestrians, and to keep staff inside the office blocks. However, there was confusion over where the bomb was. Some buildings near the bomb were evacuated, but staff were then ordered back inside by police. Some people believed the warning to be a hoax. At 6:48 p.m. the officers found the blue truck at South Quay Plaza, parked between two buildings. An officer ran to a nearby newsagents shop and told the two workers inside to leave immediately. However, the men stayed to close the shop first.

The bomb detonated at 7:01 p.m., devastating the surrounding office blocks and showering the area with broken glass. The blast was heard and felt across London, and shook the Canary Wharf Tower. Part of the South Quay Plaza was destroyed and the explosion left a crater 32 ft (10 m) wide and 10 ft (3 m) deep. John Grieve, head of the Metropolitan Police's anti-terrorist unit, described "a scene of utter devastation ... like a scene from the apocalypse". The two men in the newsagents—shop owner Inam Bashir (29), and employee John Jeffries (31)—were killed outright. They were blown through two walls and their bodies buried by rubble. More than 100 people were hurt, mainly by broken glass, 39 of whom needed hospital treatment. Most of the injured were staff in nearby office blocks. Members of a British Moroccan family were sitting in their car near the newsagents; the car was wrecked by the blast and the father received severe head injuries. He spent two weeks in a coma and suffered permanent brain damage, which left him disabled. A woman was blinded in one eye by shards of glass and needed 300 stitches on her face and arms. A second explosion caused by a gas leak hampered rescue efforts.

The blast caused an estimated £150 million worth of damage and cost insurers £170 million. Three nearby buildings (the Midland Bank building, South Quay Plaza I and II) were destroyed; the former had to be demolished and the latter two had to be rebuilt. The station itself was extensively damaged, but both it and the bridge near the bomb were reopened within weeks (through services resumed on 15 April and the station reopened on 22 April), the latter needing only cosmetic repairs despite its proximity to the blast.

== Aftermath ==
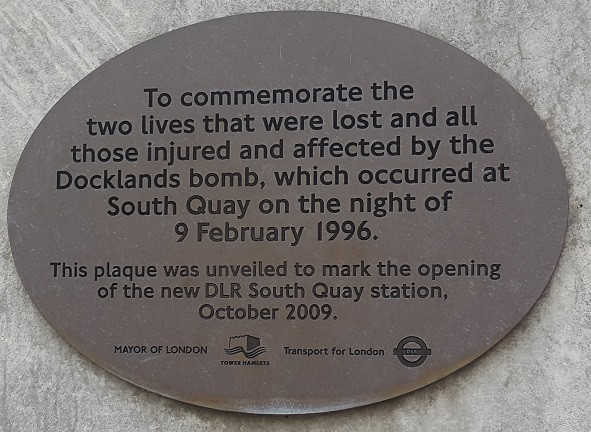
Commemorative plaque marking the IRA Docklands bombing

The attack was condemned by the British, Irish and American governments, and by the main political parties. Sinn Féin president Gerry Adams said he was saddened, but blamed the British government for the breakdown of the ceasefire, claiming "an unprecedented opportunity for peace has foundered on the refusal of the British government and Unionist leaders to enter into dialogue and substantive negotiations".

The IRA described the deaths and injuries as "regrettable", but said that they could have been avoided if police had responded promptly to "clear and specific warnings". Commissioner of the Metropolitan Police, Sir Paul Condon, said: "It would be unfair to describe this as a failure of security. It was a failure of humanity."

The attack marked the end of the IRA ceasefire during the Northern Ireland peace process at the time. On the evening of the attack, the IRA announced that it was ending its ceasefire "with great reluctance". The announcement continued:

As we stated on August 31, 1994, the basis for the cessation was to enhance the democratic peace process and to underline our definitive commitment to its success. [...] Instead of embracing the peace process, the British government acted in bad faith, with Mr Major and the Unionist leaders squandering this unprecedented opportunity to resolve the conflict. Time and again, over the last 18 months, selfish party political and sectional interests in the London parliament have been placed before the rights of the people of Ireland. [...] The blame for the failure thus far of the Irish peace process lies squarely with John Major and his government.

On 28 February, John Major, Prime Minister of the United Kingdom, and John Bruton, Taoiseach of the Republic of Ireland, announced that all-party talks would be resumed in June. Major dropped the demand for the IRA to disarm before Sinn Féin would be allowed into talks. This led to criticism from the press, which accused him of being "bombed to the table". United States congressman Bruce Morrison, who was involved in the peace process, recalled: "The great irony for me is that Canary Wharf got the Republicans to the table. The actions of the British said 'yes you can bomb your way to the conference table'". In his book on the IRA, Andy Oppenheimer wrote that "The Docklands bomb—although the British government denied it—did contribute towards bringing the parties back to the negotiating table".

Police investigators were able to re-trace the route the truck bomb had taken, thanks to eyewitness reports and CCTV footage. They obtained three thumb prints; from a site in east London where the bomb was primed, from a truck stop in Carlisle, and from the Stranraer ferry port. However, the thumb prints did not match any in police records.

In April 1997, the Special Air Service (SAS) captured an IRA sniper team in South Armagh. One of the IRA members was James McArdle, whose thumb prints matched those the investigators had obtained. McArdle was found to have driven the Docklands truck bomb from Northern Ireland to London. At Woolwich Crown Court in June 1998 he was convicted of conspiracy to cause explosions, and sentenced to 25 years in prison. The jury was deliberating on the additional charges of murder when the judge dismissed the charges because The Sun newspaper published an article about the trial. The prosecution decided to not retry the murder charges. While serving that sentence he was also convicted of being a member of the sniper team and sentenced to 50 years on those charges. McArdle was released under the terms of the Good Friday Agreement in June 2000 with a royal prerogative of mercy from Queen Elizabeth II.

== See also ==
- 1993 Bishopsgate bombing
- Aldwych bus bombing
- 1996 Manchester bombing
- Baltic Exchange bombing
- Timeline of the Northern Ireland Troubles
- Timeline of Provisional IRA actions (1990s)
