= Kotlyakovskoya Cemetery bombing =

Terrorist attack in Moscow in 1996

Kotlyakovskoye Cemetery bombing
- Location: Moscow, Russia
- Date: 10 November 1996
- Target: Soviet–Afghan War veterans group
- Attack type: Bombing
- Deaths: 14
- Injuries: 30
- Perpetrators: Andrei Anohin and Mikhail Smurov

The Kotlyakovskoye Cemetery bombing was an attack on a funeral service in Moscow which killed fourteen people on November 10, 1996. The bombing, carried out via remote control, targeted members of an Afghan War veterans support group as well as their families. The victims were attending the funeral of Mikhail Lihodey, the former president of the veterans group who had been killed with his bodyguard in 1994.

The bombing was carried out by Andrei Anohin and Mikhail Smurov, former members of the organisation who formed a splinter group following what was believed to be a dispute over profits from the sales of cigarettes and alcohol. Veterans organisations were exempt from import tax and thus had the potential to generate large profits, which along with the violent experiences of the veterans and the corrupt environment of gangster capitalism in the 1990s meant a number of these organisations became criminalised.

== See also ==
- List of terrorist incidents, 1996
