= South Quay Plaza =

Residential development in London, England

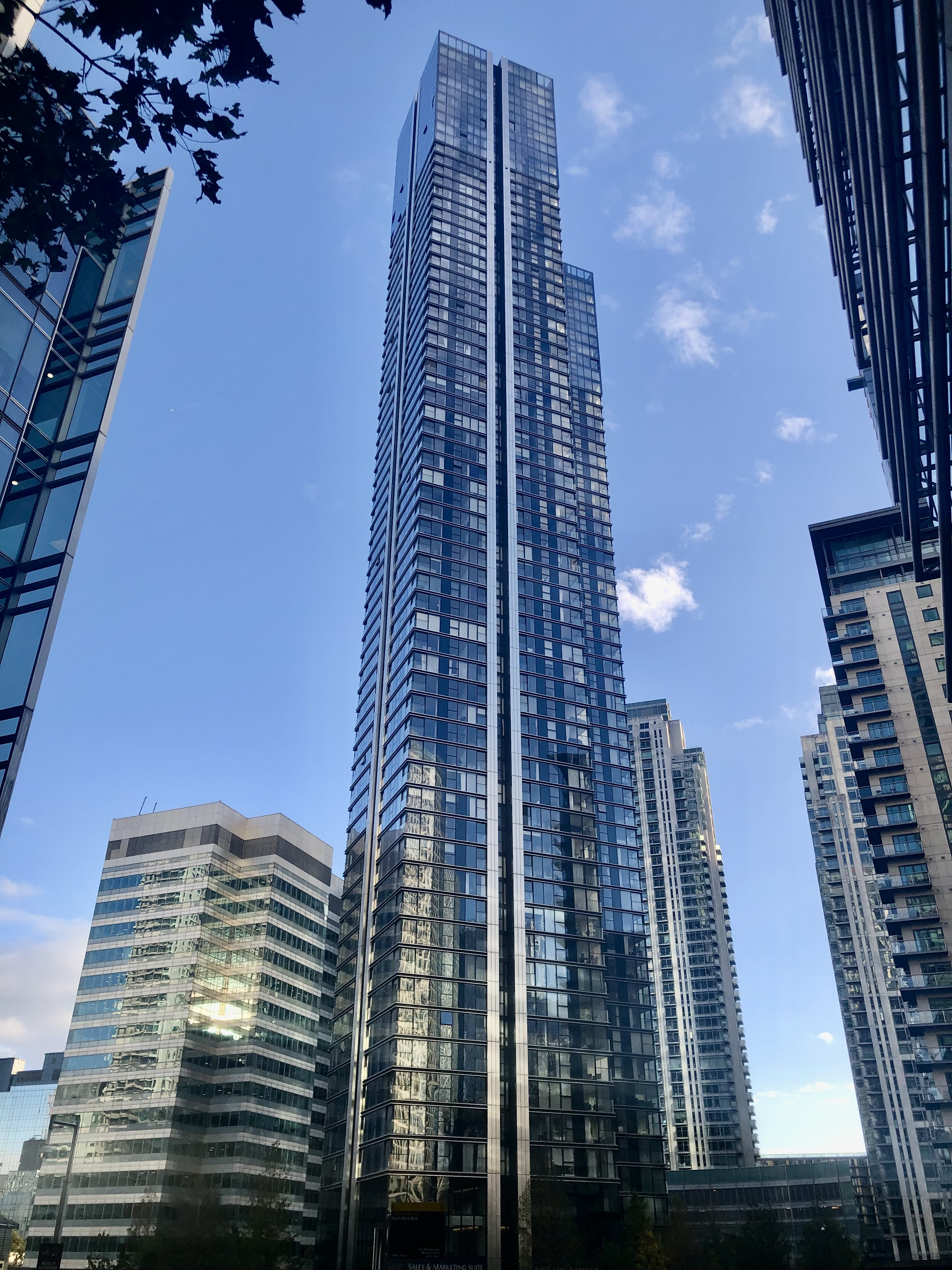
- Hampton Tower (South Quay Plaza 1) in November 2023
- Interactive map of the South Quay Plaza area

General information
- Status: Under construction
- Type: Residential
- Architectural style: Modern
- Location: 183–189 Marsh Wall, E14 9TT, London, United Kingdom
- Coordinates: 51.50104°N 0.017303°W
- Construction started: 2016
- Opening: 2021 (Phase One) / 2024 (Phase Two) / 2028 (Phase Three)
- Owner: Berkeley

Height
- Roof: 214.5 m (704 ft) / 192.4 m (631 ft) / 130.5 m (428 ft)

Technical details
- Floor count: 68 / 56 / 41

Design and construction
- Architect: Foster + Partners
- Structural engineer: WSP
- Main contractor: Laing O'Rourke

Website
- South Quay Plaza, Canary Wharf

South Quay Plaza is a primarily residential development under construction on the Isle of Dogs, London, England, within the borough of Tower Hamlets. It is being developed by Berkeley Group Holdings and was designed by architect Foster + Partners. The site of the development lies to the immediate north of Marsh Wall and to the immediate south of the financial estate of Canary Wharf. The entire development is scheduled for completion in 2028.

The development includes three towers, of which the tallest, Hampton Tower, reaches a height of 214.5 metres (704 ft); making it the third-tallest completed residential skyscraper in London. There are also new public and retail spaces, cafés and restaurants as part of the scheme.

The new development replaces three office and retail buildings on the site, which were built in the 1980s. Foundation works began following the demolition of the previous buildings on the site.

South Quay Plaza was the winner of the Best Garden/Landscaping Design award at the British Home Awards 2022.

== Site ==
South Quay Plaza is located at 183–189 Marsh Wall, South Quay, within the London borough of Tower Hamlets. The development is to the south of Canary Wharf and overlooks the South Dock, which lies to the immediate north. The nearest station is South Quay DLR, and the closest London Underground station is Canary Wharf. The South Dock Bridge, a new pedestrian bridge directly linking the South Quay Plaza site to Upper Bank Street, Canary Wharf, has received planning permission from Tower Hamlets Council and is currently under development.

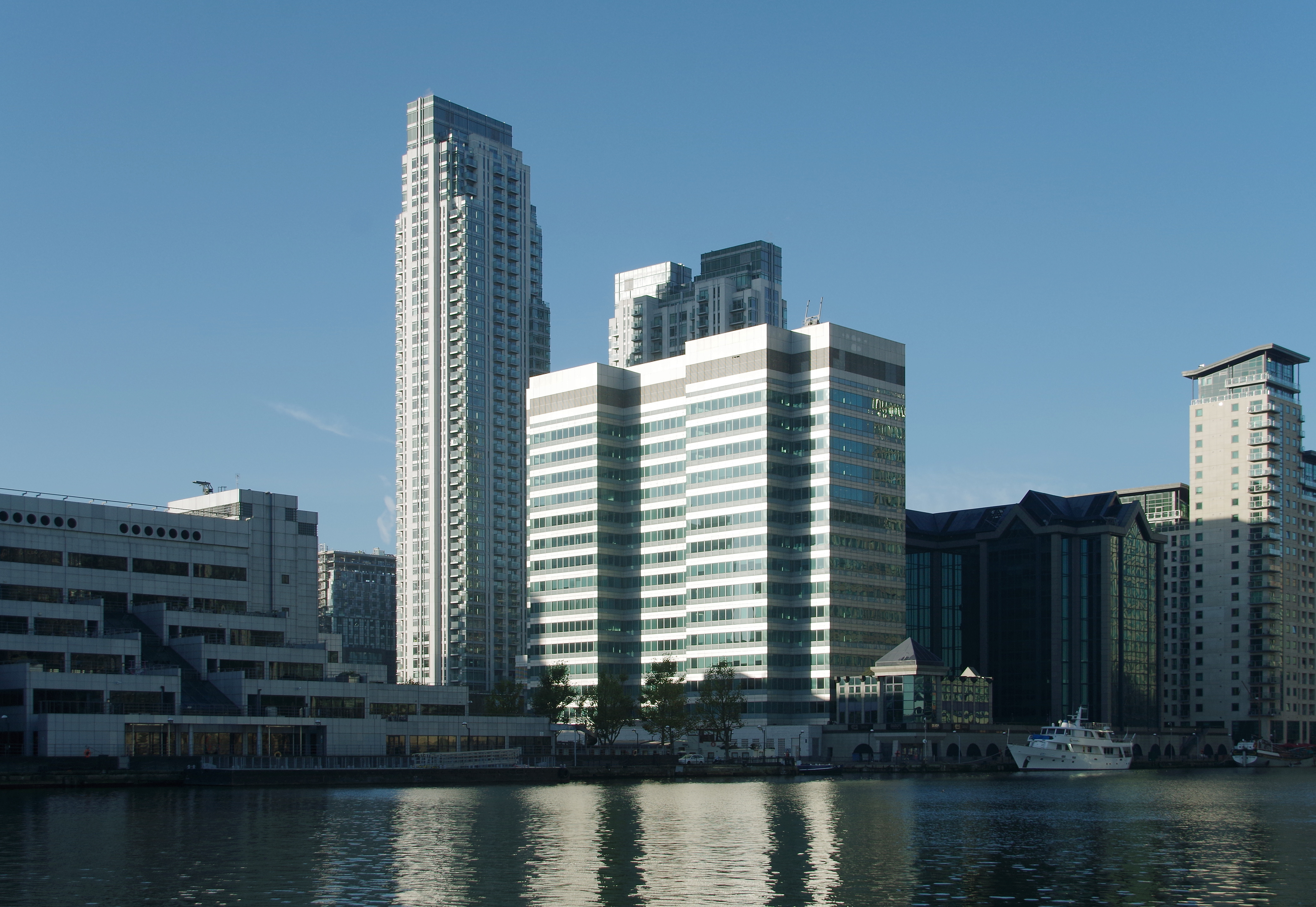
South Quay Plaza site in 2014, with Pan Peninsula in the background. The 13-storey South Quay Building (centre) remains in use.

The scheme is located in one of the first areas of any significance along Marsh Wall to be developed. South Quay 1 was constructed in 1986 and occupied by the Daily Telegraph, until their offices were moved to nearby Canary Wharf. The building then lay empty for some time; South Quay 1 was followed by South Quay 2 and then South Quay 3. For a time in the early 1990s, these office buildings dominated the area around Marsh Wall, until an IRA bombing in early 1996 eventually led to the demolition of the original South Quay 1. Although originally also scheduled for demolition, South Quay 2 was instead rebuilt and returned to use until the Berkeley scheme demolished it. South Quay 3 (189 Marsh Wall) was re-skinned after the bomb and renamed Wyndham House, then renamed again to South Quay Building.

To make way for the new development, three buildings used for offices and retail — measuring two, three and ten storeys high — were demolished. The 15-storey South Quay Building was instead kept and refurbished.

== Design and development ==
In April 2014, Berkeley obtained the South Quay Plaza buildings and site. They had already developed plans in 2013 for two residential buildings of 73 and 36 storeys. However, the taller of the two buildings, Hampton Tower, was considered too tall for the area. As a result, it was reduced in height to 68 floors and 214.5 m (704 ft). The smaller building, Berwick Tower, remained unchanged at 115.2 m (378 ft) tall.

Planning permission was granted for the development by councillors at Tower Hamlets Council in November 2014. In April 2015, the scheme received approval from the then-Mayor of London Boris Johnson, meaning the development could go ahead.

In 2015, Berkeley announced they were planning to build a third tower next to South Quay Plaza, but will form part of the same development. The skyscraper, known as Harcourt Gardens, is planned to be slightly smaller than the largest skyscraper at 192 m (630 ft), with 56 storeys containing 396 apartments, as well as 20,000 sq ft (1,900 m^{2}) of retail space. Despite being recommended for approval by planning officers, it was initially rejected by Tower Hamlets Council on 12 May 2016, before being granted planning permission on 28 July 2016.

In total, the development will provide 1,383 residential apartments and 6,000 m^{2} (65,000 sq ft) of new outdoor public space, as well as cafés and restaurants.

In 2022, Berkeley submitted a proposal to raise the height of Berwick Tower by 15.3 m (50 ft), adding five floors and 45 new homes (14 of which are affordable) to the building. The Greater London Authority approved the amended proposal in early 2024.

=== Construction ===
There will be three phases of development. Phase One, consisting of the 68-storey Hampton Tower, began in October 2016 and was completed in mid-2021. It saw the demolition of the existing buildings on the site to prepare for the largest of the three towers.

Phase Two, consisting of the 56-storey Harcourt Gardens, began in 2020 on a neighbouring site and is currently scheduled for completion in 2024.

Originally slated to began in 2018 and scheduled for completion in 2022 as part of Phase Two, the construction of the 41-storey Berwick Tower is now part of Phase Three. Existing site demolition and ground works has yet to begin.

In July 2015, construction company Laing O'Rourke won the contract to build the largest and smallest of the three buildings.

=== Development phases ===
Phase	Year start/finish	Details
1	2015–2021	Demolition of buildings, construction of Hampton Tower
2	2021–2024	Construction of Harcourt Gardens
3	2025–2028	Demolition of 185 Marsh Wall, construction of Berwick Tower

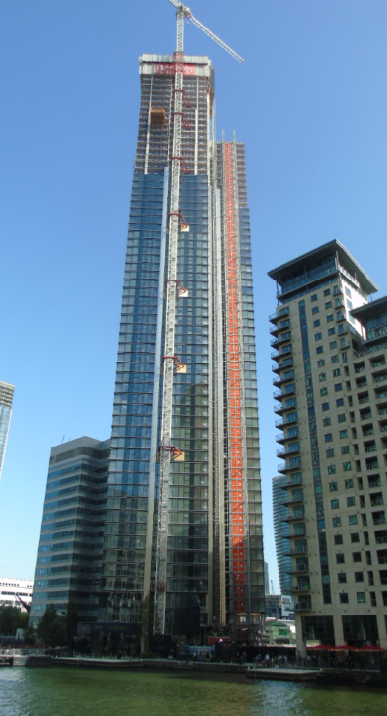
Hampton Tower (South Quay Plaza 1) in June 2019

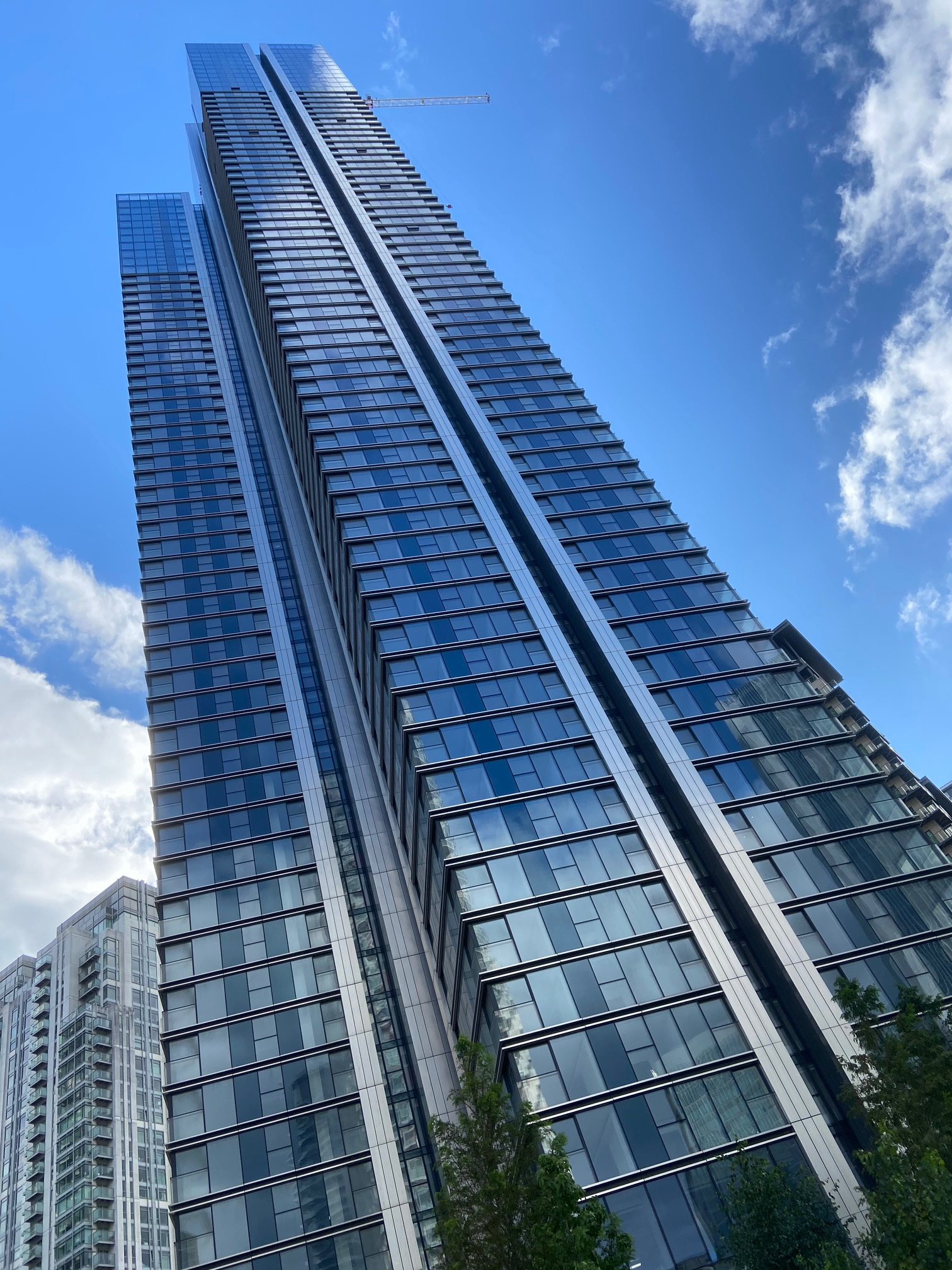
Hampton Tower (South Quay Plaza 1) in August 2020

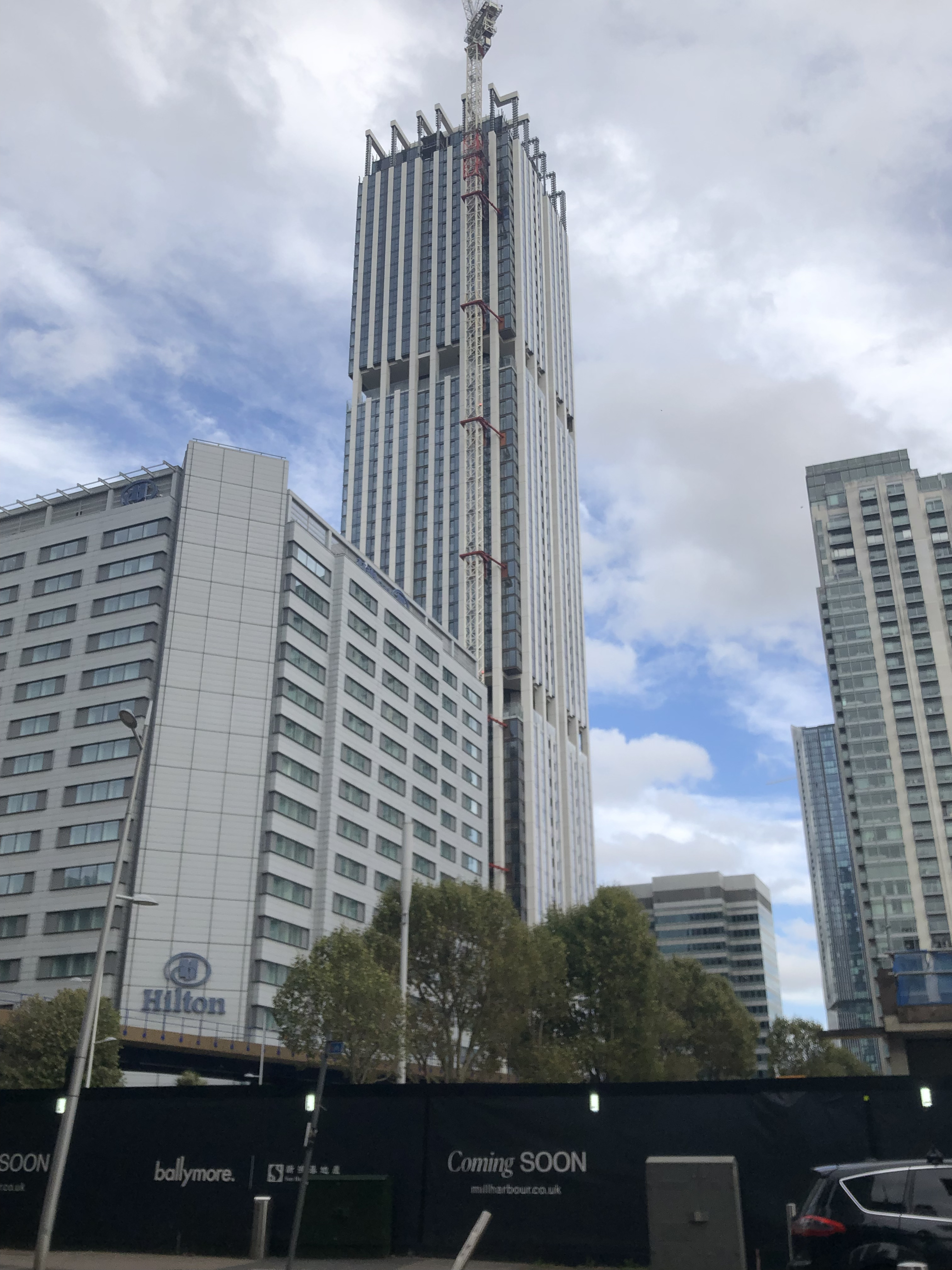
Harcourt Gardens (South Quay Plaza 4) nearing completion October 2023

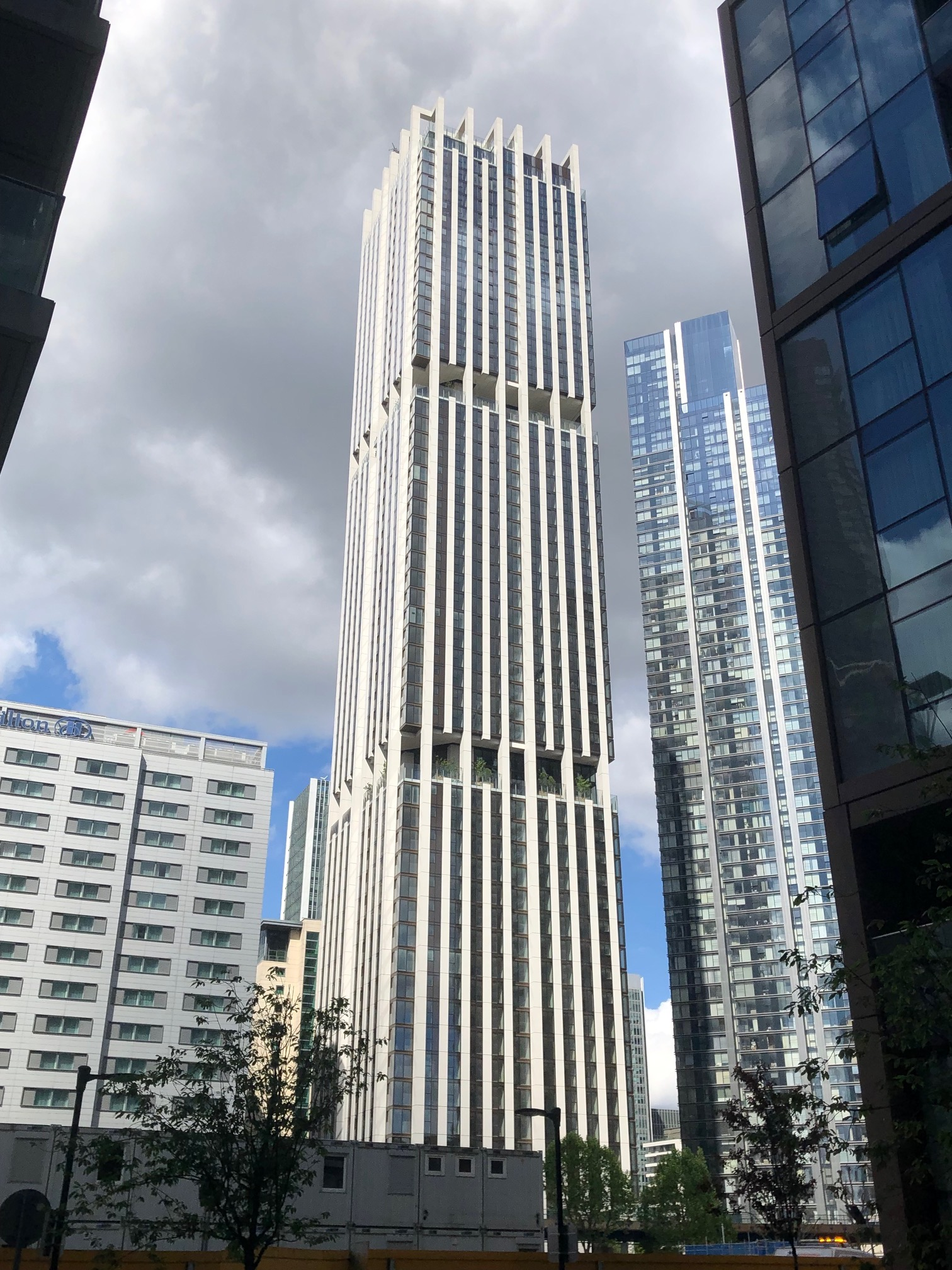
Harcourt Gardens (SQP 4) in May 2024

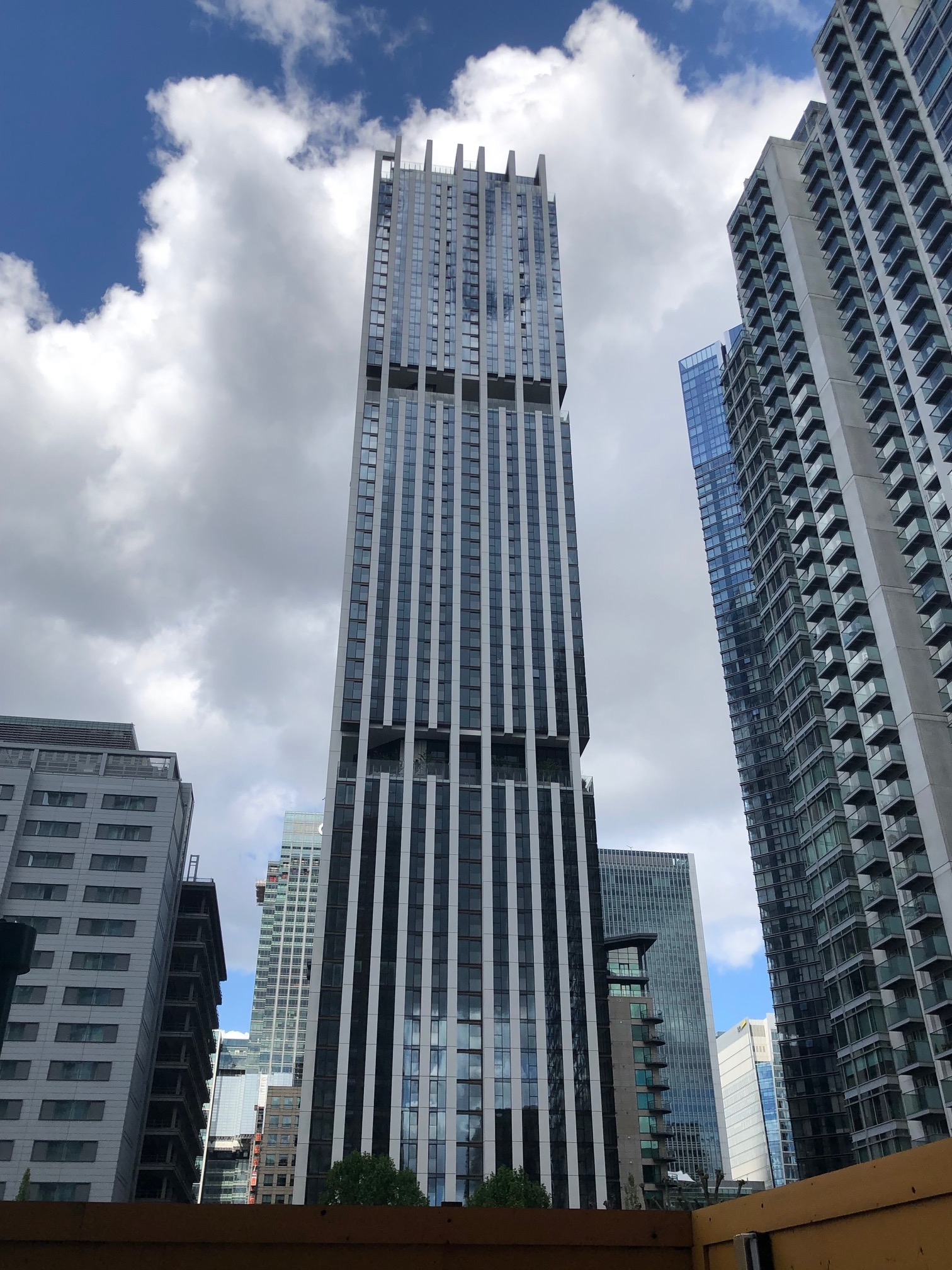
Harcourt Gardens (SQP 4) in May 2024

== See also ==
- List of tallest buildings and structures in London
- List of tallest buildings in the United Kingdom
