= 1992 Manchester bombing =

1992 IRA attack in England

- Part of The Troubles
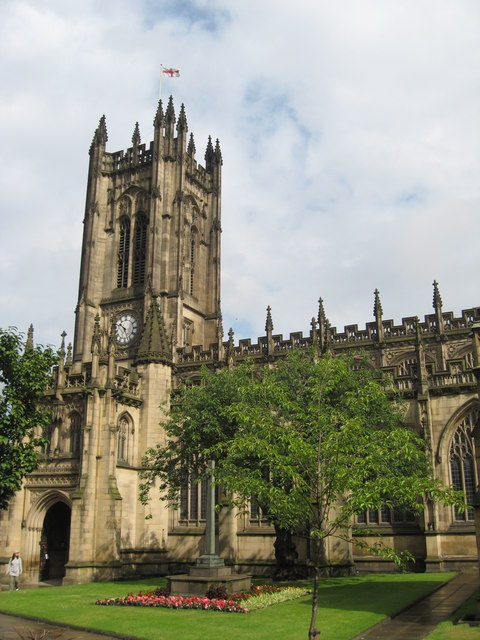
- Manchester Cathedral, near the site of the bombing
- Location: Manchester, England
- Date: 3 December 1992; 08:31 and 10:09 (UTC)
- Attack type: Car bomb, time bomb
- Deaths: 0
- Injuries: 65
- Perpetrator: Provisional IRA

The 1992 Manchester bombing was an attack by the Provisional Irish Republican Army (IRA) on Thursday, 3 December 1992. Two 2 lb (0.9 kg) bombs exploded, wounding 64 people and damaging several buildings in the city of Manchester.

== Bombing ==
The first bomb to explode was inside a car that was parked at Parsonage Gardens in the commercial district of the city. The car bomb was behind a House of Fraser store (53.48269°N 2.248658°W) and exploded at 8:31 am, injuring six people. The second bomb exploded on Cateaton Street between a market and Manchester Cathedral (53.48454°N 2.244714°W) at 10:09 am, wounding 58 people and damaging many buildings. The impact smashed the face of the cathedral clock and its stained glass windows. The cathedral provided refuge to hundreds of people who moved out of Deansgate.

== Aftermath ==
A phone call was made after the bombings, claiming more devices were in the city, forcing the police to evacuate the entire city centre of shoppers and tell others to remain indoors. No other bombs were found. The damage was estimated to have been to the value of £10 million (equivalent to about £19 million in 2017).

== Perpetrators ==
The day after the bombing, the Provisional IRA claimed responsibility for the act, which was part of their wider bombing campaign throughout the 1990s in England. Four years later, they detonated another, much more powerful, bomb in Manchester.

== See also ==
- Chronology of Provisional Irish Republican Army actions (1992–1999)
