= Tube and clamp scaffold =

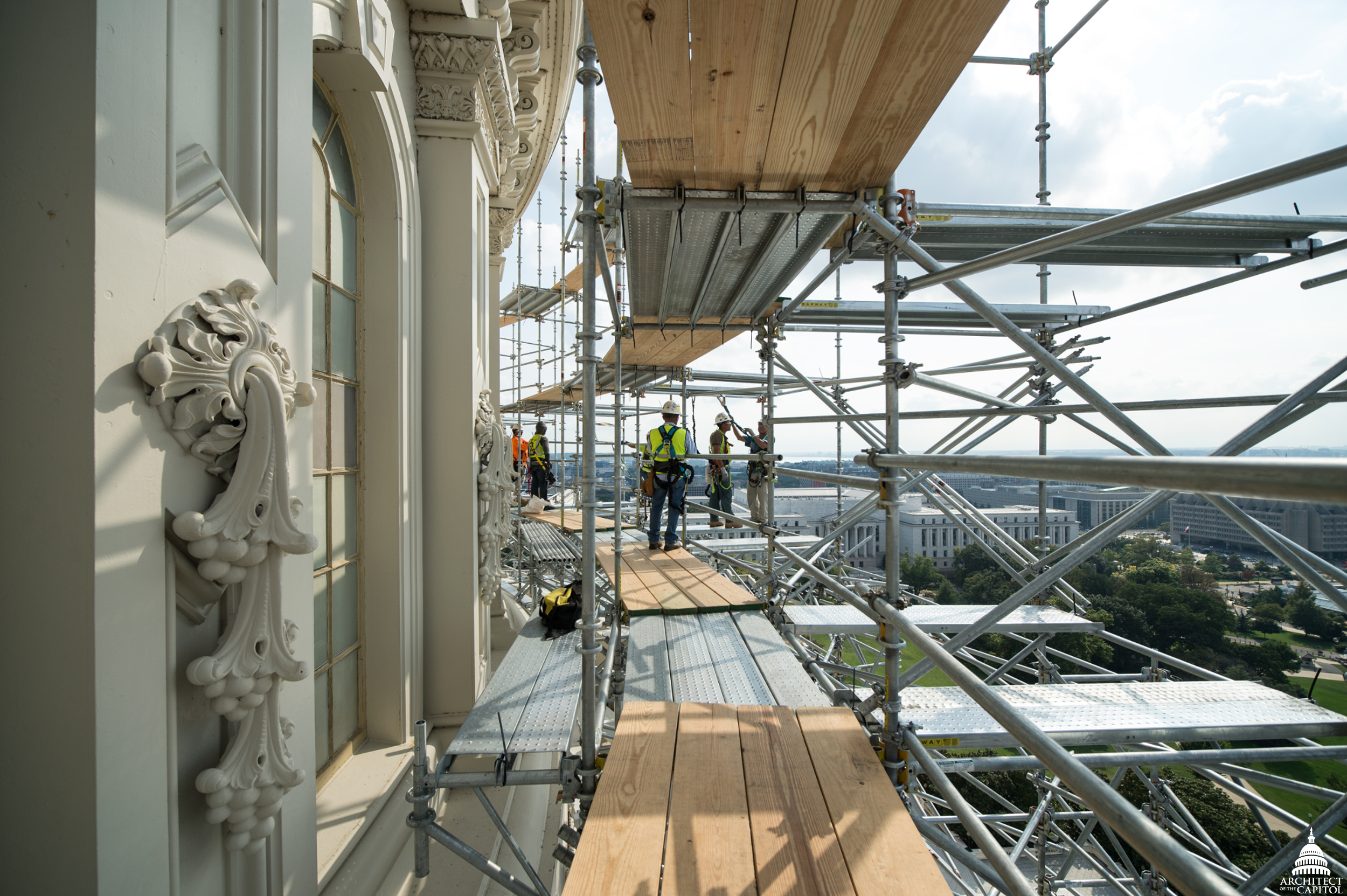
Capitol Dome restoration

Tube and clamp scaffold (commonly called tube and coupler scaffold or tube and fitting scaffold) is a versatile type of scaffold consisting of steel or aluminium tubes and clamps. Vertical tubes are connected to horizontal tubes via right angle clamps. Diagonal tubes are connected to the scaffold at regular intervals via swivel clamps in order to provide stability to the structure.

This type of scaffold is generally used where extensive versatility is required. In many countries, it is common in construction. Horizontal tubes and walking decks can be placed at any height along the vertical tube (as permitted by engineering constraints), and vertical tubes, or legs, can be spaced at any distance apart, up to the maximum distance allowed by engineering constraints.

Tube and clamp equipment can be dismantled, stored and transported with less effort than other types of scaffolding. It has the highest ratio of volume built to space required for storage.
