= 1996 Manchester bombing =

Provisional IRA attack in England

Manchester bombing
- Part of the Troubles
- Corporation Street after the bombing
- Type: Lorry bomb
- Location: Corporation Street in Manchester city centre 53°29′01″N 2°14′36″W
- Date: 15 June 1996; 30 years ago 11:17 (BST)
- Executed by: Provisional IRA; exact perpetrators unknown, one arrest in September 2022
- Casualties: 212 injured

On 15 June 1996, the Provisional Irish Republican Army (IRA) detonated a 1,500-kilogram (3,300 lb) lorry bomb on Corporation Street in the centre of Manchester, England. It was the biggest bomb detonated in Great Britain since the Second World War. It targeted the city's infrastructure and economy and caused significant damage, estimated by insurers at £700 million (equivalent to £1.3 billion in 2024), a sum surpassed only by the 1993 Bishopsgate bombing, also by the IRA.

At the time, England was hosting the Euro '96 football championship and a Russia vs. Germany match was scheduled to take place in Manchester the following day. The IRA sent telephoned warnings about 90 minutes before the bomb detonated. At least 75,000 people were evacuated from the region, but the bomb squad was unable to defuse the bomb in time. More than 200 people were injured, but there were no fatalities despite the strength of the bomb, which has been largely credited to the rapid response of emergency services in evacuating the city centre.

Although Manchester had been targeted by the IRA before, it had not been subjected to an attack on this scale. In February 1996, the IRA had ended its 17-month ceasefire with a large truck bomb attack on London's Docklands financial district, though the 3,300-pound bomb of Manchester was three times the size of the Docklands bomb. The Manchester bombing was condemned by the British and Irish Governments and US President Bill Clinton. Five days after the explosion, the IRA issued a statement from Dublin in which it claimed responsibility but regretted causing injury to civilians.

Several buildings were damaged beyond repair and had to be demolished, while many more were closed for months for structural repairs. Most of the rebuilding work was completed by the end of 1999, at a cost of £1.2 billion, although redevelopment continued until 2005. The perpetrators have not been caught, and the Greater Manchester Police (GMP) suggested it was unlikely that anyone will be charged in connection with the bombing; a suspect taken in for questioning on 8 September 2022 was interviewed and released without charges being laid.

== Background ==
From 1970, the Provisional Irish Republican Army was carrying out an armed campaign with the ultimate objective of bringing about a united Ireland. As well as attacking military and political targets, it also bombed infrastructure and commercial targets in Northern Ireland and England. It believed that by damaging the economy and causing severe disruption, it could pressure the British government to negotiate a withdrawal from Northern Ireland. Manchester had been the target of earlier IRA bombs. As part of the IRA's sabotage campaign in 1939-40 multiple bombings took place in Manchester and other English cities. In 1973 and 1974, firebombs damaged city centre businesses for which one man was later imprisoned. In April 1974, a bomb exploded at Manchester Magistrates' Court, injuring twelve. In 1975, IRA bomb factories were found in Greater Manchester, and five men were imprisoned for planning attacks in North West England. On 3 December 1992, the IRA detonated two small bombs in Manchester city centre, forcing police to evacuate thousands of shoppers. More than 60 were hurt by shattered glass and the blasts cost an estimated £10 million in damage and business losses.

The Downing Street Declaration of 1993 allowed Sinn Féin, a political party associated with the IRA, to participate in all-party peace negotiations on condition that the IRA called a ceasefire. The IRA called a ceasefire on 31 August 1994. John Major's government, dependent on Ulster Unionist Party votes, then began insisting that the IRA must fully disarm before there could be any all-party negotiations. The IRA saw this as a demand for total surrender and believed the British were unwilling to hold negotiations. It ended its ceasefire on 9 February 1996 when it detonated a powerful truck bomb in Docklands, one of the two financial districts of London. The blast killed two people and caused an estimated £150 million worth of damage. The IRA then planted five other devices in London within the space of 10 weeks.

The IRA planned to carry out a similar bombing in Manchester. The city may have been chosen because it was one of the host cities of the Euro '96 football tournament, attended by visitors and media organisations from all over Europe, guaranteeing the IRA what Margaret Thatcher called the "oxygen of publicity". A Russia vs Germany match was to take place at Old Trafford in Manchester a day after the bombing. The year before, Manchester had also won its bid to host the 2002 Commonwealth Games, at the time the biggest multi-sport event ever to be staged in Britain.

On 10 June 1996, multi-party negotiations began in Belfast. Sinn Féin had been elected to take part but were barred because the IRA had not resumed its ceasefire or agreed to disarm.

== Details of the bombing ==
The IRA's South Armagh Brigade was tasked with planning and carrying out the attack. It had also been responsible for the Docklands bombing in February, and the Bishopsgate bombing in 1993. Its members mixed the explosives in the Republic of Ireland and shipped them by freight from Dublin to England. In London, the bomb was assembled and loaded into the back of a red and white Ford Cargo lorry. On 14 June it was driven north towards Manchester, accompanied by a burgundy Ford Granada which served as a "scout car".

=== Discovery ===
Stills taken from India 99, a GMP helicopter, showing the Ford lorry moments before the blast, the explosion taking place, and the resulting mushroom cloud over the city, dwarfing the adjacent 23-storey high-rise, Arndale House

At about 9:20 am on Saturday 15 June 1996, the Ford lorry was parked on Corporation Street, outside the Marks & Spencer store, near the Arndale Centre. After setting the bomb's timer, two men—wearing hooded jackets, baseball caps and sunglasses—left the vehicle and walked to Cathedral Street, where a third man picked them up in a Ford Granada car, which was later abandoned in Preston. The truck had been parked on double yellow lines with its hazard lights flashing. Within three minutes a traffic warden had issued the vehicle with a parking ticket and called for its removal. At about 9:40 am, Granada Studios on Quay Street received a telephone call claiming that there was a bomb at the corner of Corporation Street and Cannon Street and that it would explode in one hour. The caller had an Irish accent and gave an IRA codeword so that police would know the threat was genuine. Four other telephoned warnings were sent to television/radio stations, newspapers, and a hospital.

The first policeman to arrive on the scene noticed wires running from the lorry's dashboard through a hole into the back and reported that he had found the bomb. Forensic experts later estimated that the bomb weighed 1,500–1,600 kg (3,300–3,500 lb) and was a mixture of semtex, a military-grade plastic explosive, and ammonium nitrate fertiliser, a cheap and easily obtainable explosive used extensively by the IRA. Components of what may have been a tremble trigger were also found later, designed to detonate the bomb if it was tampered with.

=== Evacuation ===
At 10:00 am, there were an estimated 75,000–80,000 people shopping and working in the vicinity. An evacuation of the area was undertaken by police officers from Bootle Street police station, supplemented by officers drafted into Manchester to control the football crowds. The police were helped by security guards from local shops.

One group worked to move people away from the bomb while another, assisted by firefighters and security guards, established a continuously expanding cordon around the area to prevent entry. By 11:10 am, the cordon was at the greatest extent that available manpower would permit, about a quarter of a mile (400 m) from the truck and 1.5 miles (2.4 km) in circumference.

=== Explosion ===
The bomb squad arrived from their Liverpool base at 10:46 am and attempted to defuse the bomb using a remote-controlled device, but they were unable to defuse the bomb, resulting in the timer expiring and activating the device. The bomb exploded at 11:17 am, causing an estimated £700 million (£1.4 billion as of 2025) of damage and affecting a third of the city centre's retail space. The Marks & Spencer's and the sky bridge connecting it to the Arndale Centre were destroyed, along with neighbouring buildings. It was the largest peacetime bomb ever detonated in Great Britain, and the blast created a mushroom cloud which rose 300 metres (1,000 feet) from the ground. The explosion could be heard up to 15 miles (24 km) away and left a crater 15 metres wide. Glass and masonry were thrown into the air, and behind the police cordon – up to 1/2 mi (800 m) away, people were showered by falling debris.

There were no fatalities, but 212 people were injured. A search of the area for casualties involved a brief confusion when mannequins blasted out of shop windows were mistaken for bodies. Hospitals across Greater Manchester were made ready to receive those injured in the blast. The police commandeered a Metrolink tram to take 50 of the casualties to North Manchester General Hospital, which treated 79 in total; a further 80 were cared for at the Manchester Royal Infirmary, and many others were treated in the streets by ambulance crews assisted by doctors and nurses who happened to be in the city centre that morning.

== Reaction ==
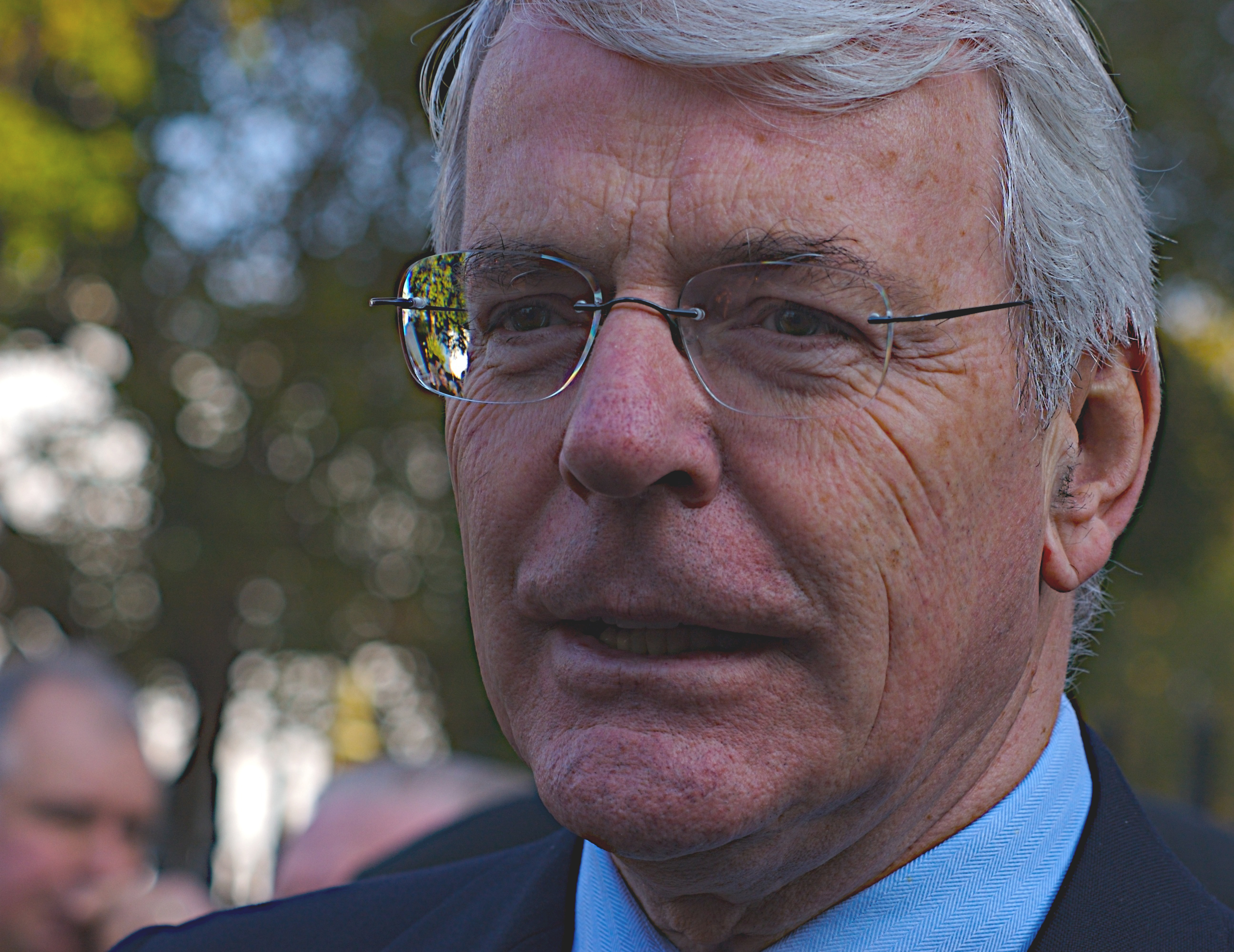
John Major, Prime Minister of Great Britain and Northern Ireland at the time of the bombing

The bombing was condemned by British Prime Minister John Major and his government, by the opposition, and by individual members of parliament (MPs) as a "sickening", "callous" and "barbaric" terrorist attack. Early on, Major stated that, "This explosion looks like the work of the IRA. It is the work of a few fanatics and ... causes absolute revulsion in Ireland as it does here". Sinn Féin was criticised by Taoiseach John Bruton for being "struck mute" on the attack in the immediate aftermath. Bruton described the bombing as "a slap in the face to people who've been trying, against perhaps their better instincts, to give Sinn Féin a chance to show that they could persuade the IRA to reinstate the ceasefire". The President of the United States, Bill Clinton, stated he was "deeply outraged by the bomb explosion" and joined Bruton and Major in "utterly condemning this brutal and cowardly act of terrorism".

Sinn Féin President, Gerry Adams, stated that he was "shocked and saddened" by the bombing. He said that his party was committed to achieving a peace settlement and argued "it is sheer folly to return to the old agenda of excluding Sinn Féin and seeking to isolate republicans". On 20 June 1996, the IRA claimed responsibility for the bombing, and stated that it "sincerely regretted" causing injury to civilians. The IRA statement continued:

The British Government has spent the last 22 months since August '94 trying to force the surrender of IRA weapons and the defeat of the republican struggle. We are still prepared to enhance the democratic peace process ... but if there is to be a lasting peace ... then the British Government must put the democratic rights of all of the people of Ireland before its own party political self interest.

The bombing came five days after the beginning of the peace talks in Belfast, and represented the IRA's opposition to talks which excluded republicans. The attack was part of a political strategy by the IRA to be included in negotiations on the IRA's own terms. According to historian Richard English: "What they were doing with their return to bombings like the Manchester bomb was saying, 'We can still return to war if we want to. We can still put off a huge bomb in your cities and devastate them and therefore you have to deal with us'".

In an effort to allay fears that Manchester's considerable Irish community might be subjected to reprisal attacks, Councillors Richard Leese and Martin Pagel – leader and deputy leader of Manchester City Council respectively – made a public visit to the Irish World Heritage Centre in Cheetham Hill. There were ultimately only a few incidents, the most serious of which occurred on the evening of the bombing, when a gang of ten men rampaged through an Irish-themed bar in the centre of Middleton, shouting the Ulster loyalist slogan "No surrender" and smashing furniture and windows. Seven days after the bombing, Manchester Council held a 'family fun day' in front of the Town Hall in Albert Square to encourage shoppers and visitors back into the city centre, the first of a "series of events and entertainments". The Euro '96 football match between Russia and Germany at Old Trafford went ahead as planned the day following the bombing, after the stadium had been heavily guarded overnight and carefully searched; the game, which Germany won 3–0, was watched by a capacity crowd of 50,700.

== Investigation ==
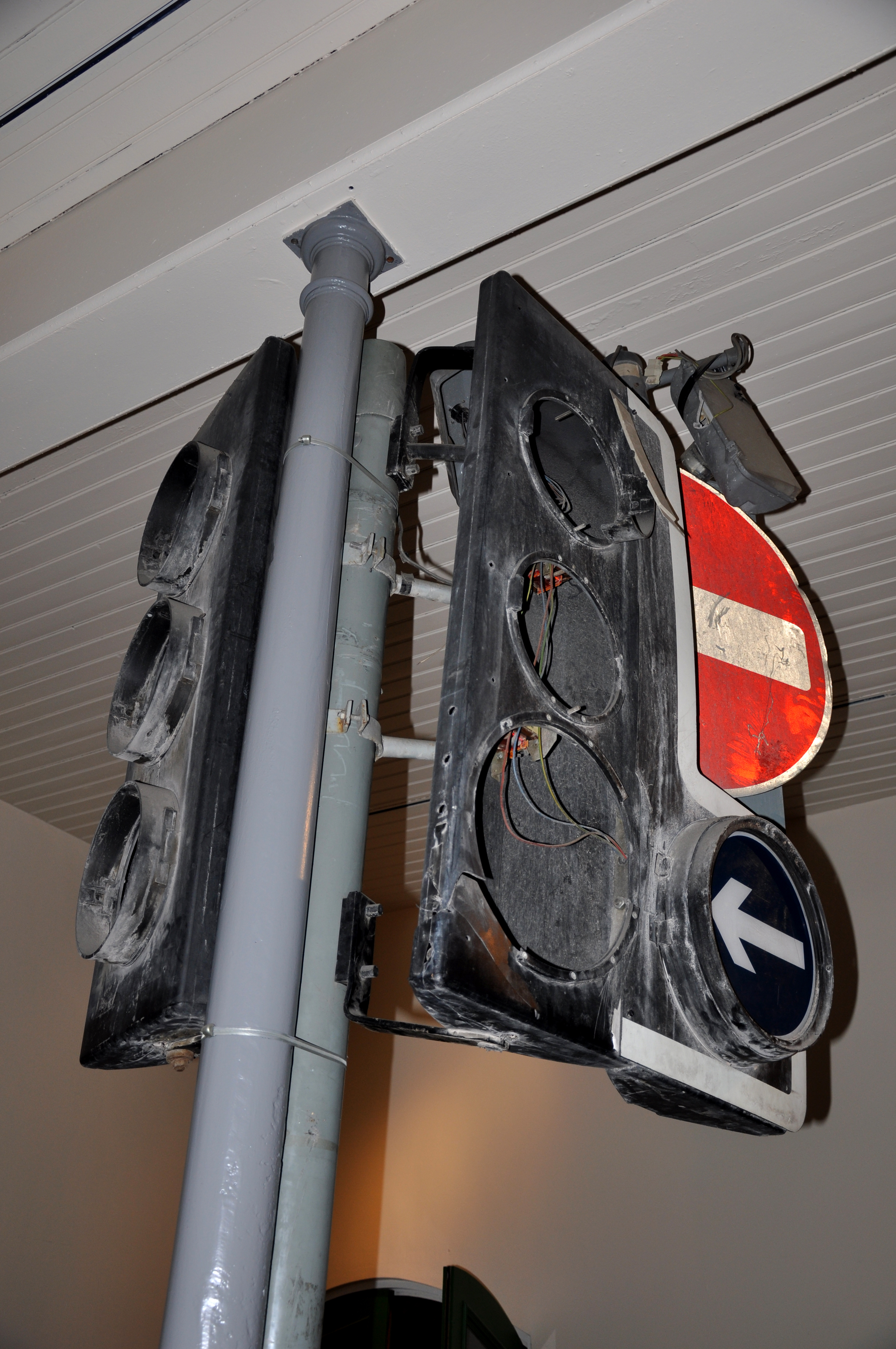
A damaged traffic light that stood on the corner of the junction between Cross Street and Market Street at the time of the explosion, now in the Museum of Science and Industry

In an effort to trace the route of the Ford lorry, police examined CCTV footage from every major road and motorway taken in England within two days of the bombing. Footage revealed that the lorry was driven south along the M1 motorway into London on the Friday afternoon before the attack. It was seen again heading north along the motorway at 7:40 pm, accompanied by the Ford Granada. Detectives surmised that the lorry had been loaded with explosives in London and that the Granada was intended to be the getaway vehicle. The lorry was last recorded travelling east along the M62 motorway towards Manchester at 8:31 am on the morning of the explosion.

Police in Manchester were aware that their Metropolitan Police colleagues in London were investigating a suspected IRA unit based in the capital, and wondered whether the London unit was responsible for the Manchester bombing. On 15 July, Metropolitan police arrested six men suspected of IRA membership: Donal Gannon, John Crawley, Gerard Hanratty, Robert Morrow, Patrick Martin, and Francis Rafferty. Each was tried and convicted of "conspiracy to cause explosions at National Grid electricity stations", and sentenced to 35 years in jail. Police in Manchester meanwhile worked to establish if the men were also responsible for the Manchester bomb.

Their investigation was led by Detective Chief Inspector Gordon Mutch of the GMP. The lorry's last registered owner told police that he had sold it to a dealer in Peterborough, who had in turn sold the lorry on to a man calling himself Tom Fox, two weeks before the bombing. After the purchase price was delivered in cash by a taxi driver, the dealer was instructed to take the lorry to a nearby lorry park, and leave it there with the keys and documents hidden inside.

On checking records of telephone calls made to the dealer, the police found that some had been made from a mobile phone registered in Ireland, and on further checking the records of that phone it appeared that the calls were made from locations consistent with the known whereabouts of the Ford lorry. One call was to a known IRA member. The phone was last used at 9:23 am on the morning of the bombing, just three minutes after the bombers had parked their lorry in Corporation Street. On 27 June, the phone's registered owner reported that it had been stolen 17 days earlier, but the police felt they had gathered enough evidence to bring a prosecution against the six IRA men held in London.

At a meeting attended by the commander of Special Branch in Manchester, a GMP assistant chief constable and a "senior officer" from the Royal Ulster Constabulary (RUC), it was decided, for reasons never made public, not to present the findings of the investigation to the Crown Prosecution Service (CPS), the body responsible for undertaking criminal prosecutions in England and Wales. The three may have felt that as the IRA suspects were already in police custody they were no longer a threat, or that to pursue the case against them may have jeopardised ongoing undercover operations. It was not until 1998 that the police finally sent their file to the CPS, who decided not to prosecute.

In September 2022, a man was arrested in connection with the bombing. According to GMP, the suspect was held at Birmingham Airport on 8 September on suspicion of terrorism offences and was interviewed by officers from Counter Terrorism Policing for the North West, before being released without charge.

=== Leak ===
Early in 1999, Steve Panter, chief crime reporter for the Manchester Evening News, leaked classified Special Branch documents naming those suspected of the bombing. The documents also revealed that the man suspected of organising the attack had visited Manchester shortly after the bombing and been under covert police surveillance as he toured the devastated city centre before returning to his home in South Armagh. Suspicion fell on Mutch as the source of the leaked documents after an analysis of mobile phone records placed both him and Panter at the same hotel in Skipton, North Yorkshire, about 40 miles (64 km) from Manchester on the same evening.

On 21 April 1999, the Manchester Evening News named Declan McCann as "a prime suspect in the 1996 Manchester bomb plot". McCann denied involvement in the bombing in a statement given by his solicitor. The newspaper reported that the file sent by GMP to the Crown Prosecution Service contained the sentence: "It is the opinion of the investigating officers of GMP that there is sufficient evidence to charge [him] with being a party in a conspiracy to cause explosions in the United Kingdom." The man denied any involvement. The Attorney General John Morris wrote in a letter to a local MP that the advice given to the CPS by an independent lawyer was that "there was not a case to answer on the evidence available ... a judge would stop the case": the Attorney General further wrote that the decision not to prosecute was not influenced by the government. The newspaper also identified the six men arrested in London on 15 July as having planned the attack. By July 2000, all six had been released under the terms of the 1998 Belfast Agreement.

Up until September 2022, Panter and Mutch were the only people to have been arrested in connection with the bombing. Mutch was tried for misconduct in a public office during an 11-day trial held in January 2002 but was acquitted. During the trial, Panter was found in contempt of court for refusing to reveal his source, an offence punishable by a term of imprisonment without the right of appeal. GMP announced in 2006 that there was no realistic chance of convicting those responsible for the bombing.

== Reconstruction ==
About twelve buildings in the immediate vicinity of the explosion were severely damaged. Overall, 530,000 square feet (49,000 m^{2}) of retail space and 610,000 square feet (57,000 m^{2}) of office space were put out of use. Insurers paid out £411 million (£800 million as of 2025) in damages for what was at the time one of the most expensive man-made disasters ever, and there was considerable under-insurance. Victims of the bombing received a total of £1,145,971 in compensation from the Criminal Injuries Compensation Authority; one individual received £146,524, the largest amount awarded as a result of this incident.

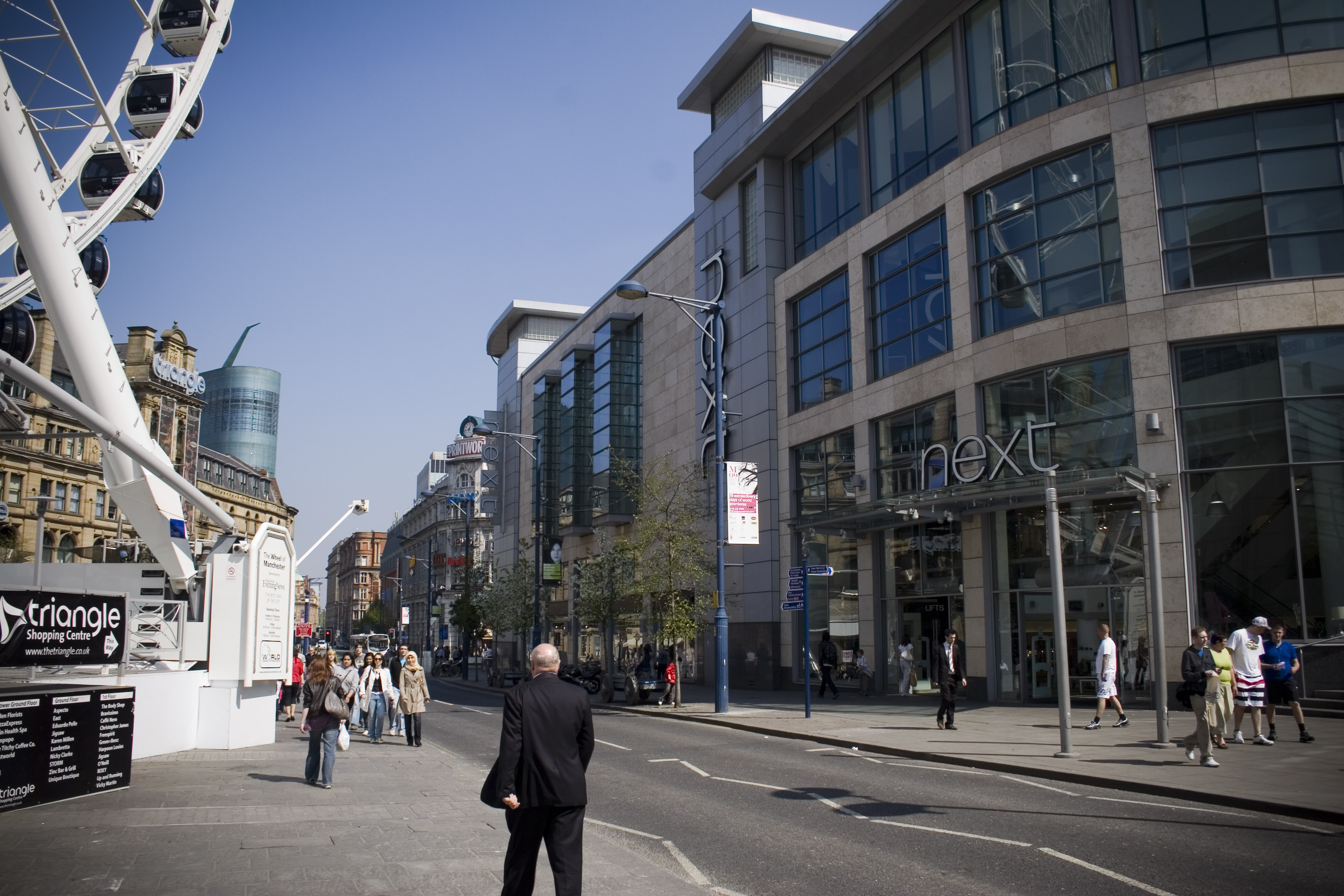
Close to the location of the blast, 2009

According to Home Office statistics, an estimated 400 businesses within half a mile (0.8 km) of the blast were affected, 40% of which did not recover. The heaviest damage was sustained by the three buildings nearest the bomb: Michael House, comprising a Marks & Spencer store and a six-storey office block; Longridge House, offices for Royal and Sun Alliance, an insurance company; and the Arndale Centre, a shopping centre. Michael House was deemed beyond economic repair and demolished. Marks & Spencer took the opportunity to acquire and demolish the adjacent Longridge House, using the enlarged site for the world's biggest branch of the store. The company's fortunes changed during construction, and Selfridges subsequently co-occupied the building; Marks & Spencer leased part of the Lewis's store in the interim. The frontage of the Arndale was badly damaged and was remodelled when this area of the city centre was redeveloped.

Coming to Manchester [after the bombing] was a journey I shall never forget. I sat on the train obviously deeply shocked and horrified. I knew that questions would be asked about what we were going to do; what is the right solution. Then I knew what the right solution was – to see this event, horrific as it was, as an opportunity and, no mucking about, we must do things on the grand scale and to the best quality we can.

— Michael Heseltine, then–Deputy Prime Minister

The glass domes of the Corn Exchange and the Royal Exchange were blown in. The landlord of the Corn Exchange invoked a force majeure condition in the lease to evict all tenants, and the building was converted into a shopping centre. The dome of the Royal Exchange shifted in the blast; its reconstruction took two and a half years and cost £32 million, paid for by the National Lottery.

The possibility of rebuilding parts of the city centre was raised within days of the bomb. On 26 June 1996, Michael Heseltine, the Deputy Prime Minister, announced an international competition for designs of the redevelopment of the bomb-affected area. Bids were received from 27 entrants, five of whom were invited to submit designs in a second round. It was announced on 5 November 1996 that the winning design was by a consortium headed by EDAW.

=== Subsequent redevelopment ===
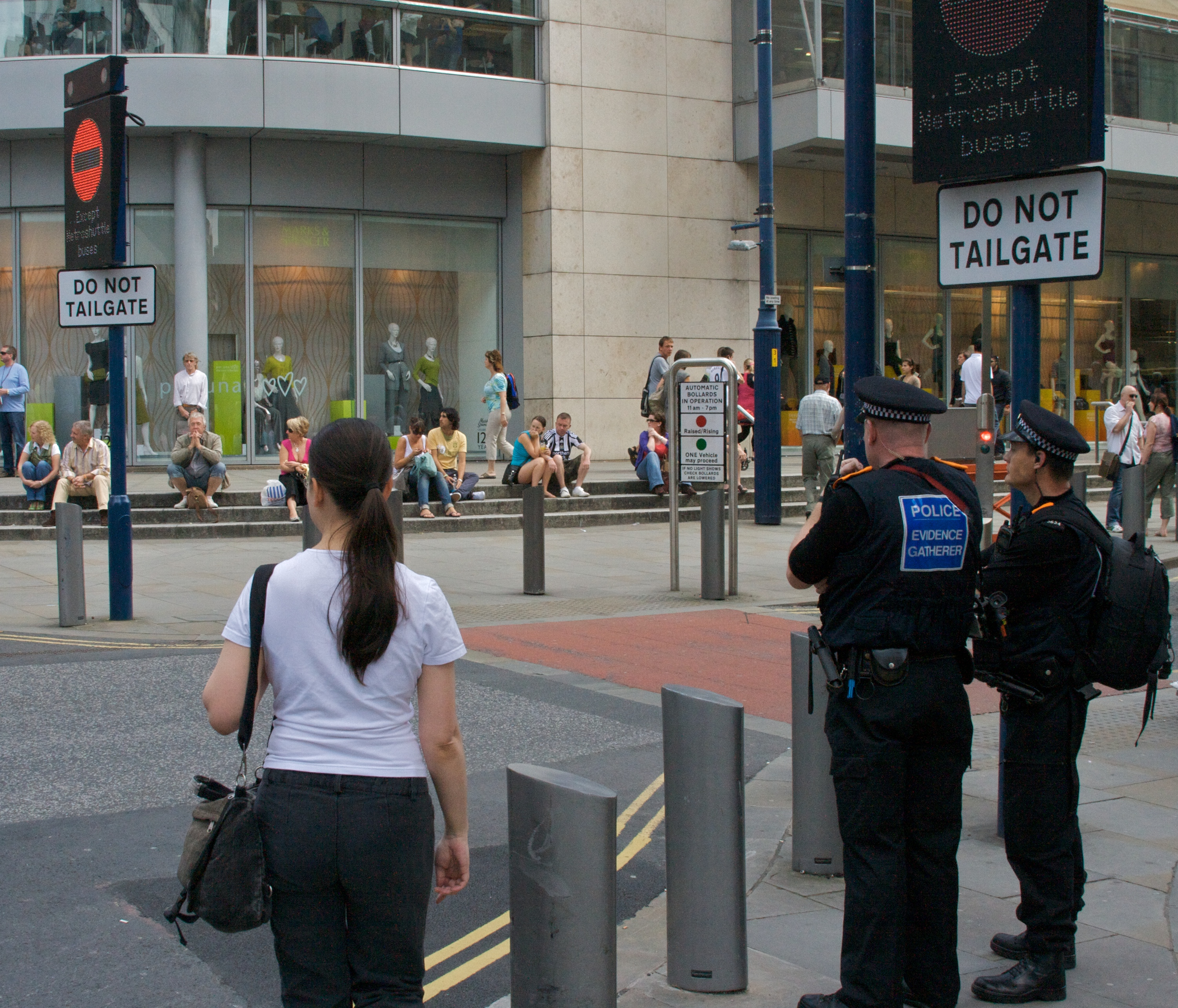
New security safeguards were included in the redevelopment of the city centre including retractable bollards and pedestrianised streets.

Much of the 1960s redevelopment of Manchester's city centre was unpopular with residents. Market Street, near the explosion and at that time the second-busiest shopping street in the UK, was considered by some commentators a "fearful" place, to be "avoided like the plague". Until Margaret Thatcher's third consecutive election victory in 1987, the staunchly Labour-controlled Manchester Council believed that Manchester's regeneration should be funded solely by public money, despite the government's insistence on only funding schemes with a significant element of private investment. Graham Stringer, leader of Manchester City Council, later admitted that after the 1987 General Election result "there was no get out of jail card. We had gambled on Labour winning the General Election and we lost." Thatcher's victory effectively put paid to Manchester's "socialist experiment", and Stringer subsequently wrote a letter of capitulation to Nicholas Ridley, then Secretary of State for the Environment, saying, "in a nutshell; OK, you win, we'd like to work together with you".

Efforts at improvement before the bombing had in some respects made matters worse, cutting off the area north of the Arndale Centre – the exterior of which was widely unloved – from the rest of the city centre. A large building nearby, now redeveloped as The Printworks and formerly occupied by the Daily Mirror newspaper, had been unoccupied since 1987. Many locals therefore considered that "the bomb was the best thing that ever happened to Manchester", as it cleared the way for redevelopment of the dysfunctional city centre, a view also expressed in 2007 by Terry Rooney, MP for Bradford North. The leader of the Liberal Democrat opposition on Manchester City Council, Simon Ashley, responded that "I take exception to his [Rooney's] comments about the IRA bomb. No one who was in the city on that day, who lost their jobs or was scared witless or injured by the blast, would say the bomb was the best thing to happen to Manchester".

Sir Gerald Kaufman, MP for Manchester Gorton, stated that the bomb provided the opportunity for redeveloping Manchester city centre, although it was not fully exploited. "The bomb was obviously bad but from a redevelopment point of view, it was a lost opportunity. While the area around St Ann's Square and Deansgate is not disagreeable, if you compare it with Birmingham and its exciting development, we've got nothing to touch that in Manchester". Howard Bernstein, chief executive of Manchester City Council, has been quoted as saying "people say the bomb turned out to be a great thing for Manchester. That's rubbish." There was already substantial regeneration and redevelopment taking place in the city centre before the bombing, in support of the Manchester bid for the 2000 Summer Olympics, its second Olympic bid. Tom Bloxham, chairman of property development group Urban Splash and of the Arts Council England (North West), agreed with Bernstein that the bomb attack was not the trigger for the large-scale redevelopment that has taken place in Manchester since the early 1990s:

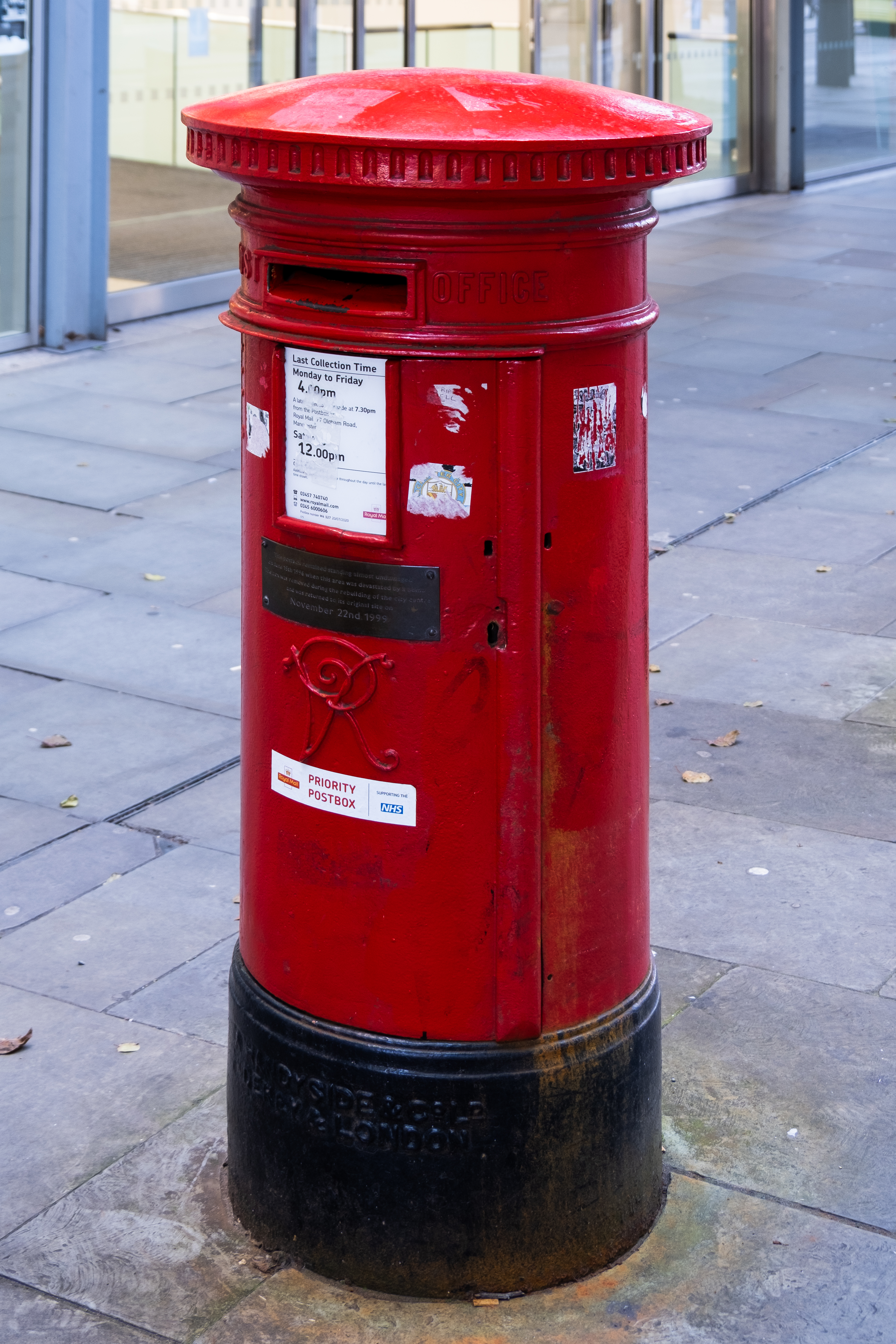
A pillar box that withstood the bomb blast. A memorial brass plaque commemorates the 1996 bomb.

For me the turning point for Manchester came before the bomb ... it was the second Olympic Games bid [in 1992] when we lost but the city suddenly had a realisation. There was a huge party in Castlefield and people grasped the idea that Manchester should no longer consider itself in competition with the likes of Barnsley and Stockport. It was now up against Barcelona, Los Angeles and Sydney and its aspirations increased accordingly.

== Memorials and legacy ==
A pillar box that survived the blast, despite being yards from the explosion, now carries a small brass plaque recording the bombing. It was removed during construction and redevelopment work, and returned to its original spot when Corporation Street reopened. The plaque reads:

This postbox remained standing almost undamaged on June 15th 1996 when this area was devastated by a bomb. The box was removed during the rebuilding of the city centre and was returned to its original site on
November 22nd 1999

A Thanksgiving service for the "Miracle of Manchester" was held at Manchester Cathedral on 24 July 2002, to coincide with the arrival of the Commonwealth Games baton, attended by Queen Elizabeth II and The Duke of Edinburgh. At 11:17 am on 15 June 2006, a candle was lit at a memorial held at Manchester Cathedral to mark the tenth anniversary of the bombing.

=== In popular culture ===
"One Man's Fool", the closing track on Genesis' 1997 album Calling All Stations, was inspired by the bombing. Tony Banks stated in a SongFacts interview:

I remember I wrote the song "One Man's Fool", which was on the Calling All Stations album. If anybody hears it now, they would assume that that lyric was referring to the bombing of the Twin Towers, but it wasn't. It was written four years before, and yet it sounds like we were recalling that. I was actually writing about a bomb attack in Manchester, in England, which was done by the IRA at the time, and the idea that people carry out these attacks and did they really believe that, all the destruction, that it really is worth it? But, it still works, unfortunately, because we have this kind of terrorism still out there.

== See also ==
- Baltic Exchange bombing
- Timeline of Provisional IRA actions (1990s)
- List of terrorist incidents in 1996
- Manchester Arena bombing
- Oklahoma City bombing
- Timeline of the Northern Ireland Troubles
