= AZF =

AZF may refer to:

- AZF (factory) (French initialism for AZote Fertilisant, i.e. nitrogen fertiliser)
- AZF (terrorist group) believed to have taken its name from an explosion at the AZf factory in Toulouse
- Azoospermia factor
- Azidophenylalanine
