= Explosion =

Rapid, energetic expansion of matter

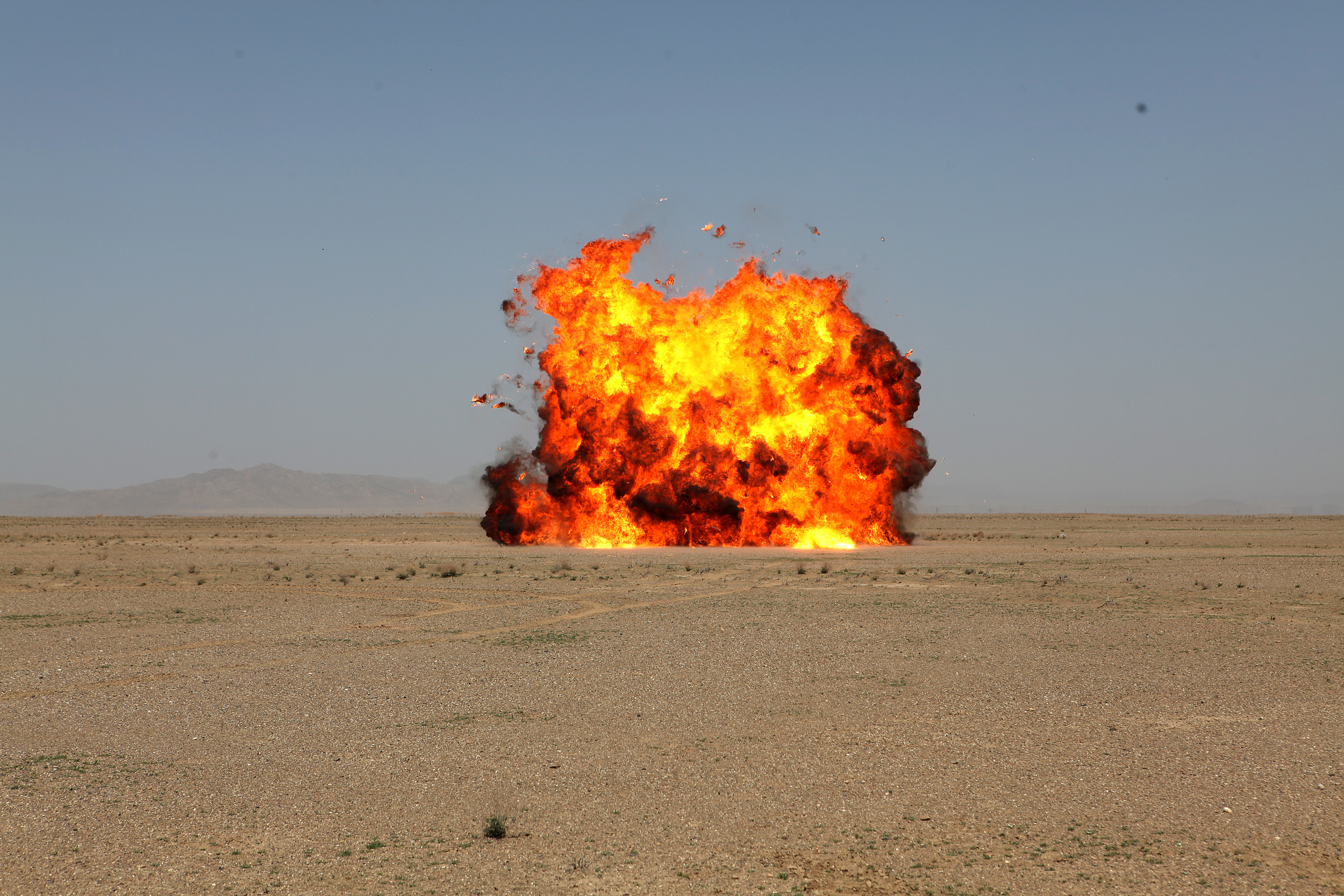
Explosion of unserviceable ammunition and other military items

The explosion of the Castle Nectar nuclear bomb.

An explosion is a rapid expansion in volume of a given amount of matter associated with an extreme outward release of energy, usually with the generation of high temperatures and release of high-pressure gases. Explosions may also be generated by a slower expansion that would normally not be forceful, but is not allowed to expand, so that when whatever is containing the expansion is broken by the pressure that builds as the matter inside tries to expand, the matter expands forcefully. An example of this is a volcanic eruption created by the expansion of magma in a magma chamber as it rises to the surface. Supersonic explosions created by high explosives are known as detonations and travel through shock waves. Subsonic explosions are created by low explosives through a slower combustion process known as deflagration.

== Definition ==
In a broad sense an explosion is an event that grows rapidly and is initially unconstrained. In physics, an explosion is a "process of rapid physical and chemical transformation of a system in to mechanical work accompanied by a change of its potential energy". The term work in physics means the application of a force to displace a mass, causing it to gain kinetic energy.

Explosions in air create shock wave front. If the velocity of the shock wave exceeds the local speed of sound, the explosion is a detonation; slower speeds are called deflagration and these require confinement to create an explosion.

== Etymology ==
Classical Latin explōdō means "to hiss a bad actor off the stage", "to drive an actor off the stage by making noise", from ex- ("out") + plaudō ("to clap; to applaud"). The word evolved:

- Around 1650: "drive out with violence and sudden noise"
- Around 1790: "go off with a loud noise"
- Around 1882: first use as "bursting with destructive force"

== Types ==
=== Volcanos ===
Explosive volcanic eruptions occur when rising magma is trapped below cold solid rock. Gas in the magma comes out of solution and builds pressure beneath the solid rock. When the cap rock gives way the gas pressure is suddenly released in an explosive eruption ejecting volcanic debris at high speed. The gas-infused magma from the early stages of eruption create frothy light weight pumice. As ejected pumice falls back on to the volcano, secondary explosion can occur shattering the pumice in to volcanic ash.

=== Deflagration and Fire ===
Dust fire occur when a flammable material is dispersed within a confined space and heated in presence of oxygen. An initial primary explosion can disperse more material caused secondary explosions. The events have occurred in agricultural, chemical, food processing, manufacturing, recycling and coal burning sites.

Explosions frequently occur during bushfires in eucalyptus forests where the volatile oils in the tree tops suddenly combust.

=== Astronomical ===
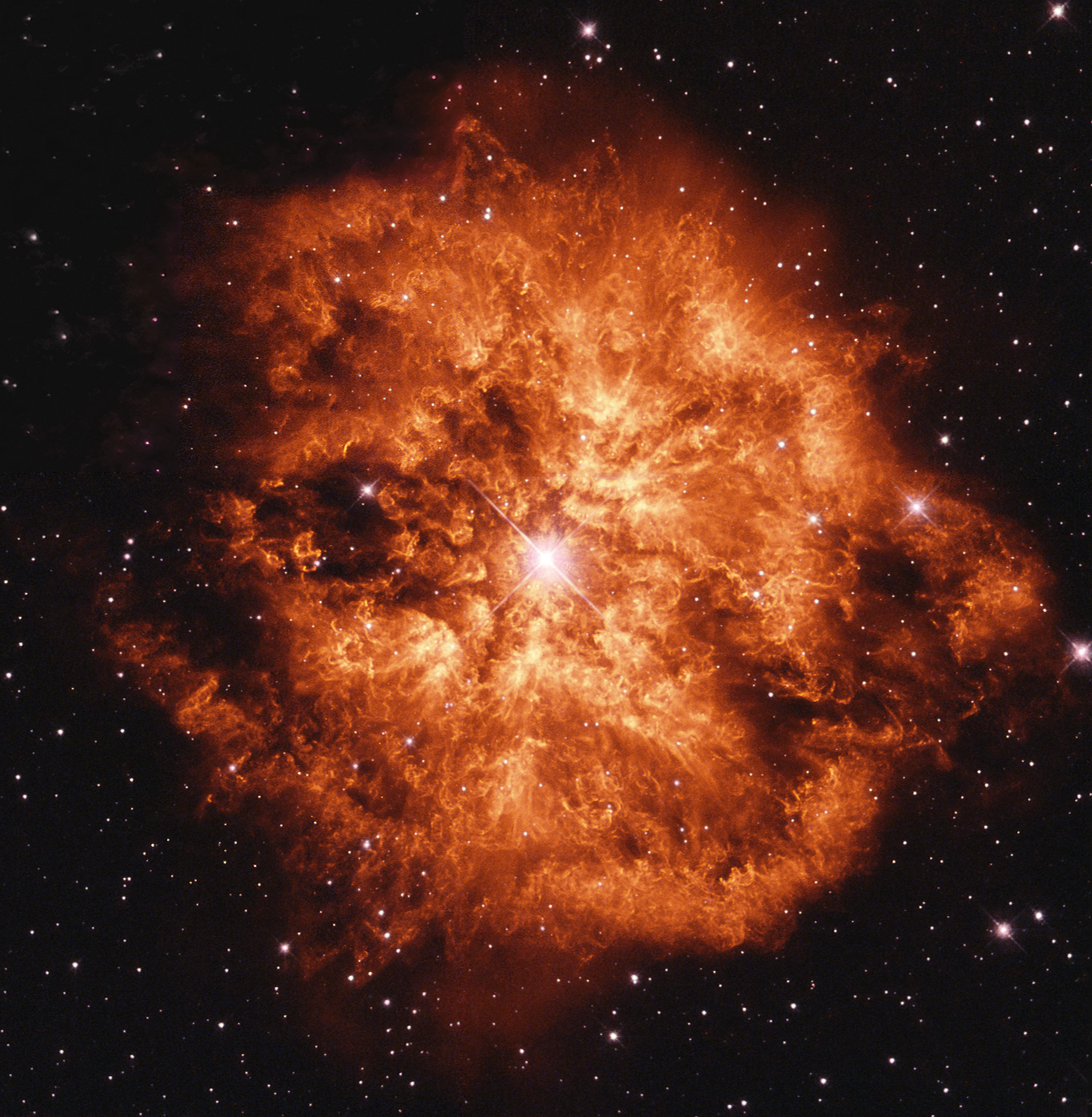
The nebula M1-67 around Wolf–Rayet star WR 124 is the remnants of a stellar explosion, which is currently observed as six light years across

Among the largest known explosions in the universe are supernovae, which occur after the end of life of some types of stars. Solar flares are an example of common, much less energetic, explosions on the Sun, and presumably on most other stars as well. The energy source for solar flare activity comes from the tangling of magnetic field lines resulting from the rotation of the Sun's conductive plasma. Another type of large astronomical explosion occurs when a meteoroid or an asteroid impacts the surface of another object, or explodes in its atmosphere, such as a planet. This occurs because the two objects are moving at very high speed relative to each other (a minimum of 11.2 kilometres per second (7.0 mi/s) for an Earth impacting body). For example, the Tunguska event of 1908 is believed to have resulted from a meteor air burst.

Black hole mergers, likely involving binary black hole systems, are capable of radiating many solar masses of energy into the universe in a fraction of a second, in the form of gravitational waves. This is capable of transmitting ordinary energy and destructive forces to nearby objects, but in the vastness of space, nearby objects are rare. The gravitational wave observed on 21 May 2019, known as GW190521, produced a merger signal of about 100 ms duration, during which time is it estimated to have radiated away nine solar masses in the form of gravitational energy.

=== Chemical ===
The 2025 Shandong factory explosion is an example of a chemical explosive.

The most common artificial explosives are chemical explosives, usually involving a rapid and violent oxidation reaction that produces large amounts of hot gas. Gunpowder was the first explosive to be invented and put to use. Other notable early developments in chemical explosive technology were Frederick Augustus Abel's development of nitrocellulose in 1865 and Alfred Nobel's invention of dynamite in 1866.

An accidental chemical explosion is often initiated by an electric spark or flame in the presence of oxygen. The Fire triangle is visual device illustrating the three required ingredients for a fire or explosion: a fuel, oxdizer, and an ignition source.

Intentional chemical explosives generally contain both a fuel and an oxidizer. Chemical reactions that cause explosions are typically either unimolecular decomposition reactions where a single material like TNT decomposes or multi-molecular reduction-oxidation (redox) reactions where two or more materials combine, like black powder.

=== Electrical and magnetic ===
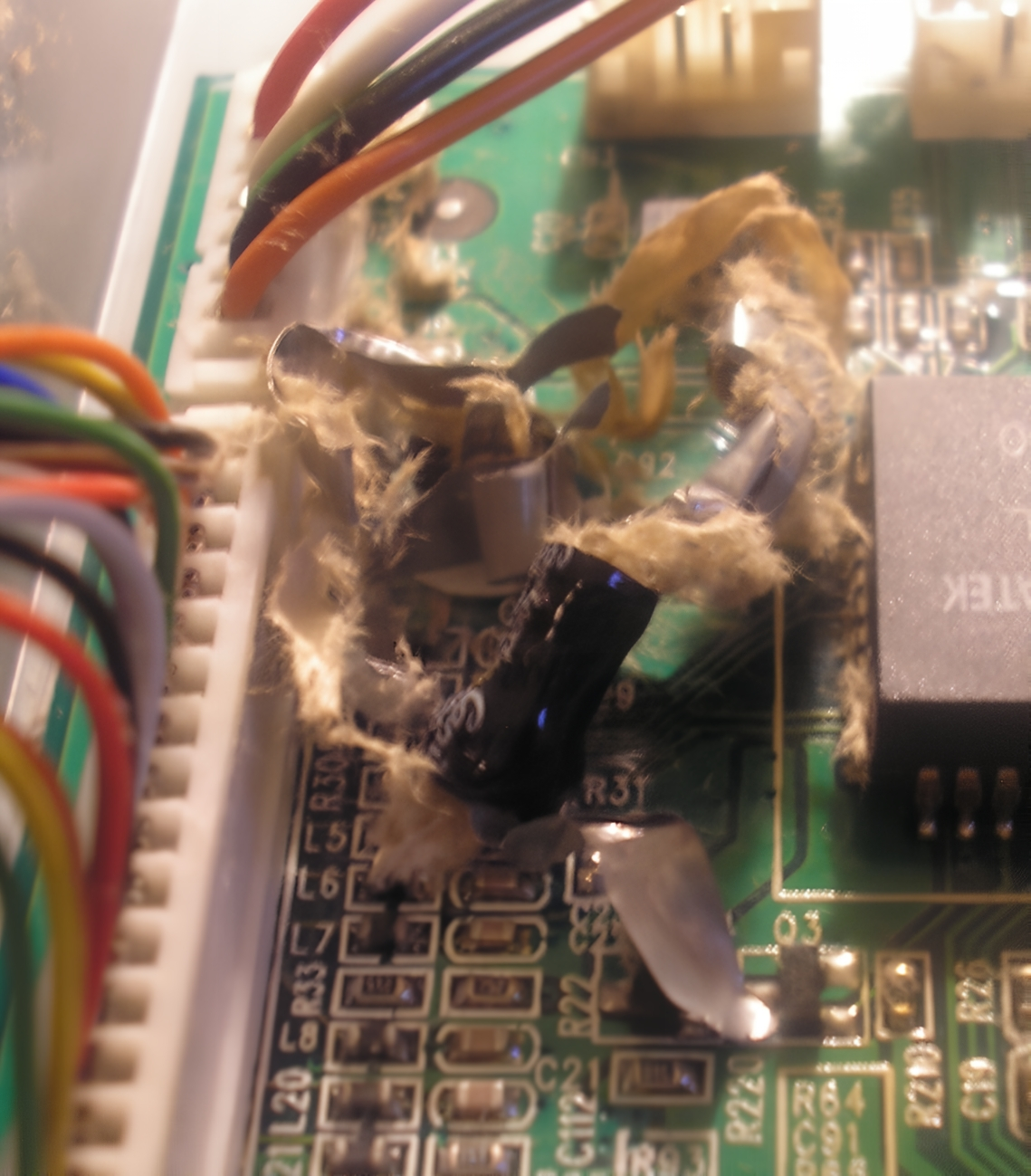
A capacitor that has exploded

A high current electrical fault can create an "electrical explosion" by forming a high-energy electrical arc which rapidly vaporizes metal and insulation material. This arc flash hazard is a danger to people working on energized switchgear.

Solar flares are magnetic explosions believed to be caused by magnetic reconnection in the Sun's atmosphere. The massive energy released can disrupt telecommunications equipment on Earth.

=== Mechanical and vapor ===
Strictly a physical process, as opposed to chemical or nuclear, e.g., the bursting of a sealed or partially sealed container under internal pressure is often referred to as an explosion. Examples include an overheated boiler or a simple tin can of beans tossed into a fire.

Boiling liquid expanding vapor explosions are one type of mechanical explosion that can occur when a vessel containing a pressurized liquid is ruptured, causing a rapid increase in volume as the liquid evaporates. Note that the contents of the container may cause a subsequent chemical explosion, the effects of which can be dramatically more serious, such as a propane tank in the midst of a fire. In such a case, to the effects of the mechanical explosion when the tank fails are added the effects from the explosion resulting from the released (initially liquid and then almost instantaneously gaseous) propane in the presence of an ignition source. For this reason, emergency workers often differentiate between the two events.

=== Nuclear ===
In addition to stellar nuclear explosions, a nuclear weapon is a type of explosive weapon that derives its destructive force from nuclear fission or from a combination of fission and fusion. As a result, even a nuclear weapon with a small yield is significantly more powerful than the largest conventional explosives available, with a single weapon capable of completely destroying an entire city.

== Properties ==
=== Force ===
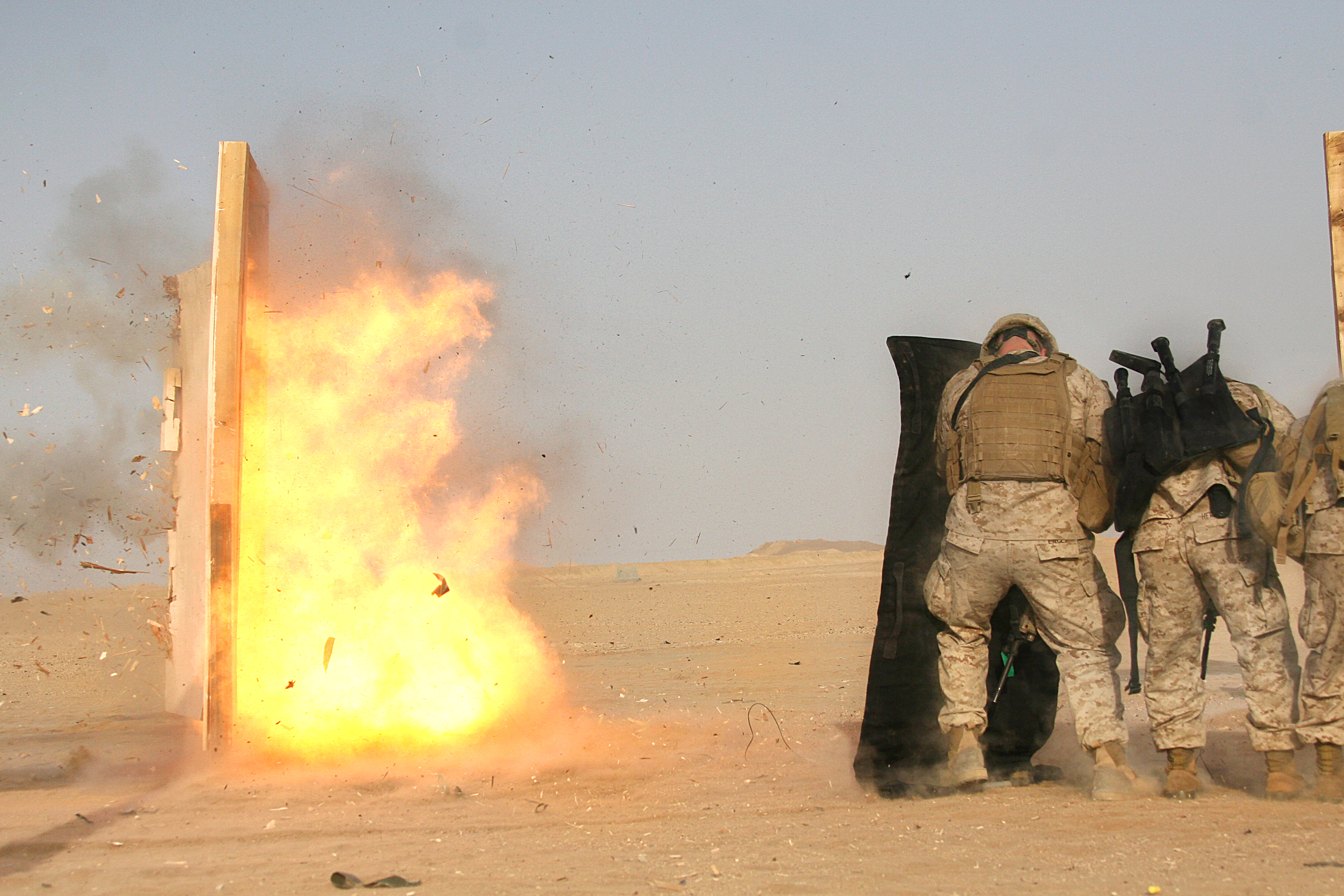
A breaching charge exploding against a test door during training

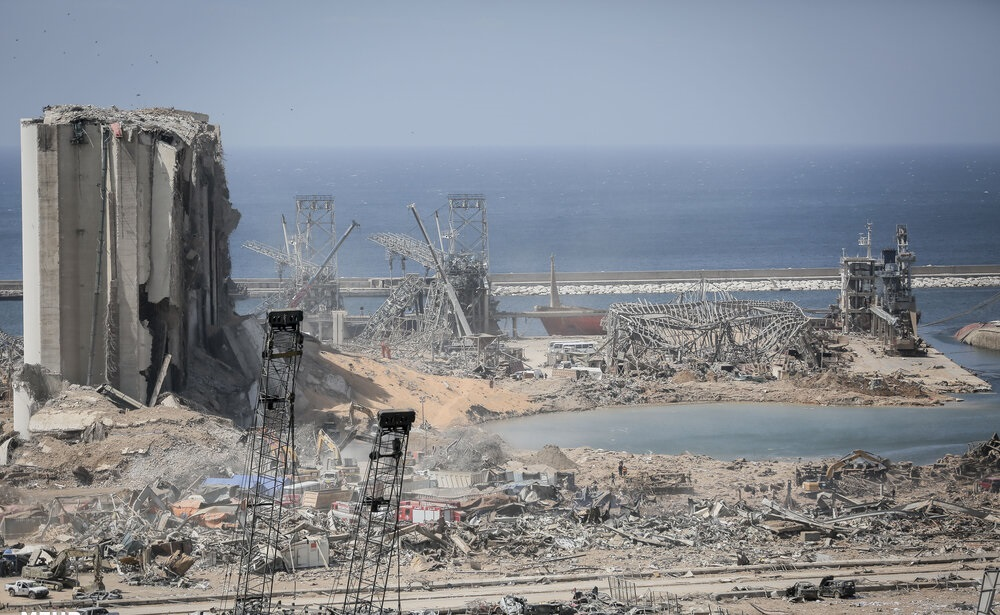
The effects of the 2020 Beirut explosion

Explosive force is released in a direction perpendicular to the surface of the explosive. If a grenade is in mid air during the explosion, the direction of the blast will be 360°. In contrast, in a shaped charge the explosive forces are focused to produce a greater local explosion; shaped charges are often used by military to breach doors or walls.

=== Velocity ===
The speed of the reaction is what distinguishes an explosive reaction from an ordinary combustion reaction. Unless the reaction occurs very rapidly, the thermally expanding gases will be moderately dissipated in the medium, with no large differential in pressure and no explosion. As a wood fire burns in a fireplace, for example, there certainly is the evolution of heat and the formation of gases, but neither is liberated rapidly enough to build up a sudden substantial pressure differential and then cause an explosion. This can be likened to the difference between the energy discharge of a battery, which is slow, and that of a flash capacitor like that in a camera flash, which releases its energy all at once.

=== Evolution of heat ===
The generation of heat in large quantities accompanies most explosive chemical reactions. The exceptions are called entropic explosives and include organic peroxides such as acetone peroxide. It is the rapid liberation of heat that causes the gaseous products of most explosive reactions to expand and generate high pressures. This rapid generation of high pressures of the released gas constitutes the explosion. The liberation of heat with insufficient rapidity will not cause an explosion. For example, although a unit mass of coal yields five times as much heat as a unit mass of nitroglycerin, the coal cannot be used as an explosive (except in the form of coal dust) because the rate at which it yields this heat is quite slow. In fact, a substance that burns less rapidly (i.e. slow combustion) may actually evolve more total heat than an explosive that detonates rapidly (i.e. fast combustion). In the former, slow combustion converts more of the internal energy (i.e. chemical potential) of the burning substance into heat released to the surroundings, while in the latter, fast combustion (i.e. detonation) instead converts more internal energy into work on the surroundings (i.e. less internal energy converted into heat); cf. heat and work (thermodynamics) are equivalent forms of energy. See Heat of Combustion for a more thorough treatment of this topic.

When a chemical compound is formed from its constituents, heat may either be absorbed or released. The quantity of heat absorbed or given off during transformation is called the heat of formation. Heats of formations for solids and gases found in explosive reactions have been determined for a temperature of 25 °C and atmospheric pressure, and are normally given in units of kilojoules per gram-molecule. A positive value indicates that heat is absorbed during the formation of the compound from its elements; such a reaction is called an endothermic reaction. In explosive technology only materials that are exothermic—that have a net liberation of heat and have a negative heat of formation—are of interest. Reaction heat is measured under conditions either of constant pressure or constant volume. It is this heat of reaction that may be properly expressed as the "heat of explosion."

=== Initiation of reaction ===
A chemical explosive is a compound or mixture which, upon the application of heat or shock, decomposes or rearranges with extreme rapidity, yielding much gas and heat. Many substances not ordinarily classed as explosives may do one, or even two, of these things.

A reaction must be capable of being initiated by the application of shock, heat, or a catalyst (in the case of some explosive chemical reactions) to a small portion of the mass of the explosive material. A material in which the first three factors exist cannot be accepted as an explosive unless the reaction can be made to occur when needed.

=== Fragmentation ===
Fragmentation is the accumulation and projection of particles as the result of a high explosives detonation. Fragments could originate from: parts of a structure (such as glass, bits of structural material, or roofing material), revealed strata and/or various surface-level geologic features (such as loose rocks, soil, or sand), the casing surrounding the explosive, and/or any other loose miscellaneous items not vaporized by the shock wave from the explosion. High velocity, low angle fragments can travel hundreds of metres with enough energy to initiate other surrounding high explosive items, injure or kill personnel, and/or damage vehicles or structures.

== In culture ==
In aerospace engineering, the term rapid unscheduled/unplanned disassembly is humorously used as a euphemism for the explosion of an aircraft or spacecraft. It was used by Elon Musk in 2015 after a failure of its Falcon 9 first-stage landing mechanism after it lost control just before landing.

== Notable examples ==
=== Chemical ===
- 1626 Wanggongchang Explosion
- 1717 Siege of Belgrade (1717)
- 1887 Nanaimo mine explosion
- 1917 Halifax Explosion
- 1917 Battle of Messines
- 1921 Oppau explosion
- 1944 Bombay explosion
- West Loch disaster
- 1944 Port Chicago disaster
- 1944 RAF Fauld explosion
- 1947 Cádiz Explosion
- 1947 Texas City disaster
- 1960 Nedelin catastrophe
- 1969 Soviet N1 rocket explosion
- 1974 Flixborough disaster
- 1977 Iri station explosion
- 1988 PEPCON disaster, Henderson, Nevada
- 1988 Poole explosion
- 1994 Port Neal fertilizer plant explosion
- 2001 AZF (factory)
- 2004 Ryongchon disaster
- 2005 Hertfordshire Oil Storage Terminal fire
- 2008 Gërdec explosions
- 2009 Cataño oil refinery fire
- 2011 Zoraiz disaster
- 2013 West Fertilizer Company explosion
- 2015 Tianjin explosions
- 2016 Scrtho factory explodes
- 2020 Beirut explosion
- 2023 Starship explosion

=== Nuclear ===
- Trinity test
- Ivy Mike
- Castle Bravo
- Tsar Bomba
- 1945 Atomic bombings of Hiroshima and Nagasaki

=== Volcanic ===
- Minoan eruption
- Eruption of Vesuvius in 79 AD
- 1257 Samalas eruption
- 1883 eruption of Krakatoa
- 1980 Mount St. Helens eruption
- 1815 eruption of Mount Tambora
- 1991 Mount Pinatubo eruption
- 2022 Hunga-Tonga Hunga-Ha'apai eruption
- Oruanui eruption
- Toba supereruption
- Yellowstone Caldera

=== Stellar ===
- SN 1006
- SN 1572
- Kepler's Supernova
- Solar storm of 1859

=== Airbursts/Impact events ===
- Meteor Crater
- Chichxulub impact
- 2013 Chelyabinsk airburst
- Theia impact
- Tunguska event

=== Transport/Aviation ===
- September 11 attacks
- Lac-Mégantic rail disaster
- 2023 Ohio train derailment
- Pan Am Flight 103
- TWA Flight 800
- Tenerife airport disaster

=== Other ===
- Chernobyl disaster
- 2007 New York City steam explosion

== See also ==
- Combustion
- Standards for electrical equipment in potentially explosive environments
- Explosion protection
- Explosive limit
- Fuel tank explosion
- Implosion (mechanical process): opposite of explosion
- Internal combustion engine
- Mushroom cloud
- Total body disruption, a cause of death typically associated with explosion
- Underwater explosion
