= Toulouse chemical factory explosion =

2001 explosion at AZF fertiliser factory in Toulouse, France

Coordinates: 43.567°N 1.427°E

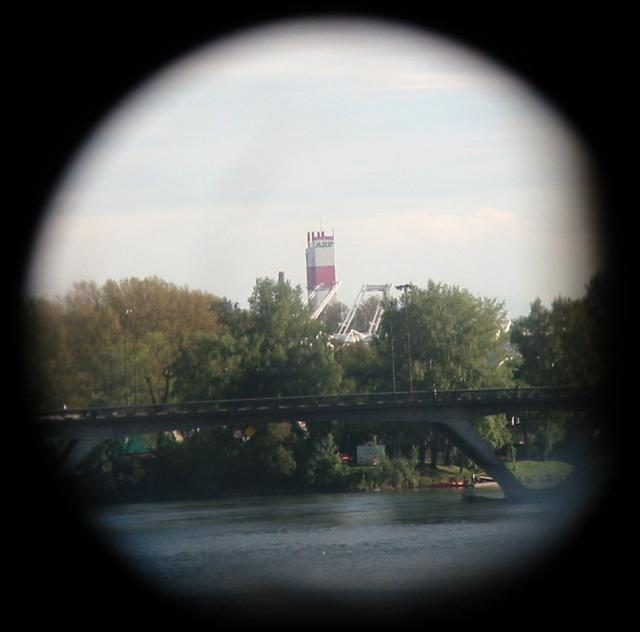
- AZF from city center, 4 or 5 km (through tourist public telescope)
- Date: 21 September 2001
- Venue: AZF factory
- Location: Toulouse, France
- Type: Explosion (~20–30 tons of TNT)
- Cause: Sodium dichloroisocyanurate and ammonium nitrate mishandling and reaction
- Deaths: 31
- Injuries: 2,500

On 21 September 2001, an explosion occurred at the AZF (French initialism for Azote fertilisant, or nitrogen fertiliser) fertiliser factory in Toulouse, France, belonging to Grande Paroisse, a subsidiary of Total.

Three hundred tonnes of ammonium nitrate was stored (the maximum capacity was 2,000 tonnes) in Hangars 221 and 222. The entire factory was destroyed and made a crater with a depth of about 7 metres (23 ft) and a diameter of 40 metres (130 ft). Steel girders were found 3 kilometres (1.9 mi) away from the explosion site. The blast measured 3.4 on the Richter scale, with an estimated power equivalent to 20-40 tons of TNT. The explosion was heard up to 100 km (62 mi) away, and the sound of the explosion could be heard as far as Canejan, Spain, 90 km (56 mi) south of Toulouse. The acoustics of the hills and the loud sound caused the explosion to be reported as occurring in multiple places. Police at first believed that at least five bombs had simultaneously gone off. There is still controversy over the exact number of explosions.

The factory was near the city, with one of the most inhabited areas, Le Mirail, only 1 kilometre (0.62 mi) away. Around 10 percent of the people of Toulouse had to be evacuated.

== Victims ==
The disaster caused 31 deaths, about 30 seriously wounded people, and 2,500 light casualties. Two thirds of the city's windows were shattered, which caused 70 eye wounds. The total damages paid by insurance groups exceeded 1.5 billion euros. The large number of victims was a result of multiple factors, a leading one being the fact that "a large number of people was [sic] allowed to stay in the close vicinity of the fire and became vulnerable to the subsequent explosion."

== Investigation ==
On 4 October 2001, French Environment Minister Yves Cochet announced that the explosion "may have been a terrorist attack" (the explosion occurred ten days after the September 11 attacks) and identified Hassan Jandoubi, a plant sub-contractor who was killed in the blast, as a person under investigation. French anti-terrorist authorities were prohibited by the Toulouse prosecutor from searching Jandoubi's house for five days after the incident.

Police declared that Jandoubi had "possible Islamic fundamentalist sympathies." However, by when the search was finally conducted, the police stated that Jandoubi's girlfriend had disposed of all traces of his clothes and photos. Authorities described the delay as damaging to the investigation.

In May 2006, the official investigation released a final report supporting the chemical accident theory in which sodium dichlorocyanurate, mixed with 500 kg (1,100 lb) of ammonium nitrate, spilled on the main nitrate pile 20 minutes before the explosion.

However, the result has been contested, as the official story "remains challenged despite the latest trial outcome" by "the lawyers of Total and other experts."

== See also ==
- List of ammonium nitrate disasters
