= William F. Roach =

Catholic priest killed in Texas City disaster

William Francis Roach Jr.
- Born: August 6, 1908; Philadelphia, Pennsylvania, US
- Died: April 16, 1947 (aged 38); Texas City, Texas, US
- Education: St. John the Baptist Home Mission Seminary, Little Rock, Arkansas
- Occupation: Catholic priest
- Years active: 1939–1947

Father William Francis Roach Jr. (6 August 1908 – 16 April 1947) also known as "Father Bill", was a Catholic priest. A popular community figure in Texas City, Fr. Roach was killed in the 1947 Texas City disaster.

== Early life ==
William "Bill" Roach Jr. was born on August 6, 1908, in Philadelphia, Pennsylvania, alongside his twin brother, John. Raised in Sharon Hill, both brothers attended Holy Spirit School and later West Catholic High School. Following graduation, both experienced a deepening of their Catholic faith and discerned vocations to the priesthood.

In the early 1930s the Roach twins were rejected by several dioceses, including Philadelphia and Baltimore, due to financial constraints during the Great Depression. They were eventually accepted into St. John the Baptist Home Mission Seminary in Little Rock, Arkansas. When the seminary later required full tuition the brothers could not afford, they sought another diocese and were subsequently admitted to the Diocese of Galveston, Texas.

== Texas ==
Bill and John Roach were ordained on May 18, 1939 by Bishop Christopher Byrne. John went on to serve in prominent diocesan roles, including as director of Texas Catholic Charities, until his death in 1987. Bill's early ministry took place in the rural Hill Country of central Texas, where he became known for his generosity, ascetic lifestyle, and dedication to his parishioners. His outreach extended to non-Catholics, and he occasionally used humor to defuse anti-Catholic hostility, including attempts from the Ku Klux Klan to intimidate him.

In his early assignments in the Texas Hill Country, Fr. Bill Roach became known as a 'builder of churches,' constructing five new parish buildings using his own carpentry skills and local materials to reduce costs for his working-class parishioners. He also worked to expand parish life by personally transporting residents of all backgrounds - white, Black, Hispanic, and Protestant - to Mass on a bus he operated through rural communities.

After World War II, Roach was reassigned to St. Mary of the Miraculous Medal Parish in Texas City, a rapidly growing industrial community on Galveston Bay. He earned a strong reputation among parishioners, including youth whom he encouraged toward religious vocations. Two such parishioners later entered the Monastery of the Holy Infant Jesus in Lufkin, Texas, a Dominican foundation established in 1945 with the Roach twins' assistance. Fr. Bill frequently mediated disputes over workplace issues, including wages and safety, becoming a respected intermediary in the region's industrial environment.

=== Texas City disaster ===
In the months preceding the 1947 Texas City disaster, Fr. Bill Roach occasionally remarked on the hazards of the area's rapidly expanding petrochemical industry. One evening, while sitting on the steps of his parish church and looking out over the industrial skyline, he remarked to passing parishioners that he felt as though he were "sitting on a keg of dynamite," a comment later remembered as foreshadowing the disaster that followed.

On 16 April 1947, the French-registered vessel SS Grandcamp, then loading ammonium nitrate at the docks of Texas City, Texas, caught fire. At 09:12 a.m. the cargo detonated, triggering what became the worst industrial accident in U.S. history. Among those killed was Fr. Bill Roach, who had driven to the waterfront to help after noticing smoke.

Fr. Bill Roach's church, St. Mary of the Miraculous Medal Parish, was also severely damaged in the explosion.

== Legacy ==
In 2022, author John Neal Phillips published Sitting on a Keg of Dynamite: Father Bill, Texas City, and a Disaster Foretold, a historical account of the 1947 Texas City disaster that places particular focus on Roach's life and final days. The book's title references Roach's remark, made shortly before the explosion, that living amid Texas City's industrial landscape felt like "sitting on a keg of dynamite." Phillips situates Roach's life and the 1947 disaster within broader discussions of labor relations and industrial safety, drawing parallels between mid-20th-century regulatory practices and contemporary industrial accidents.

In January 2023, following the publication of the book, the Dallas Historical Society held a lecture on Fr. Bill, hosted by John Neal Phillips.
