= Ostedijk =

The Ostedijk is a Dutch cargo ship that sent out a distress call on 17 February 2007 when it was about 20 kilometers off the northwestern tip of Spain (east of Estaca de Bares)

The ship was transporting 6,012 tons of a fertilizer NPK 15-15-15C from Porsgrunn in Norway to the Spanish Mediterranean city of Valencia. On the 17 February, the captain of the ship radioed that there was a "chemical reaction" in the ship's cargo, leading him to stop engines. The vessel was near the port of A Coruña. The Spanish authorities sent a support team to look at the ship but nothing wrong was detected and the Ostedijk was allowed to continue her voyage to Valencia. A day later, the captain radioed again that the chemical reaction in the cargo was continuing and that white smoke was coming out of # 2 section of the cargo hold. The Spanish authorities then towed the ship away from the coast and began consultation with technical experts.

Specialists were sent to the vessel, they took measurements with infrared cameras, estimating that the top of the fertilizer had reached about 200 °C. As time went by and no action was taken, the plume continued to grow. On the morning of the 20th, a nearby tugboat started throwing water over the ship's cover to cool down the cargo but the effect was negligible. Land personnel were sent aboard the ship to open the cargo containers on the 21st. As the cargo was aired, the smoke plume grew - in a matter of minutes it was about 10 meters in diameter and several hundred meters in length. On the 22nd, three special pipes/spears were inserted into the cargo and delivered water. The fire decayed over the following few days and by 1 March the fire was declared extinguished. Ostedijk was sent to the nearby port of Bilbao to unload the cargo.

The status of the current official investigation is unknown. However, this kind of incident is a well-known hazard with some types of NPK fertilizers, and is responsible for the loss of several cargo ships and chemical plants, (see examples in Ammonium nitrate disasters). Large stockpiles of the material can be a major fire risk due to their supporting oxidation, it may also detonate. Ammonium nitrate (AN), a common element in inorganic fertilizers like NPKs, exothermically decomposes into gases when heated to temperatures above 210 °C. The reaction can become self-sustaining (known as self-sustaining decomposition, or SSD), which is a thermal runaway (i.e. a fire event with a chemistry not based on oxygen consumption).

Analysis of plume images carried out at The University of Edinburgh shows a rapidly growing fire and gives an estimate of the evolution of the cargo mass loss rate, ranging from approximately 0.5 kg/s the first day to 12 kg/s on the last day. Aided by small-scale experiments with NPK samples, the study estimated that the power of the event was in the order of 6-30 MW on day five.

== Chronology ==
- 17 Feb, 2:30, the vessel makes the first emergency call while navigating 50 miles north of A Coruña. The captain stops engines.
- The Spanish authorities send a support team. Nothing wrong is detected and at 22:30 Ostedijk is allowed to continue to travel to Valencia accompanied by the tugboat Don Inda.
- 18 Feb, 11:30, The captain radios again that there was a "chemical reaction" in the cargo and that more white smoke is coming out of #2 section of the hold. Engines are stopped again 34 miles northeast of Cabo Vilán.
- The Spanish authorities tow the vessel to a position 14 miles north of Viveiro and consult technical experts.
- The gas affects the crew and four members are evacuated to hospital by air.
- On the morning of 20 Feb, a tugboat starts throwing water over the ship's cover to cool down the cargo.
- On 21 Feb, personnel are sent aboard the ship to open the cargo containers. The smoke plume grows even more.
- On 22 Feb, special water pipes/spears are inserted into the cargo.
- On 23 Feb, the fire is controlled.
- On 28 Feb, the vessel is allowed to continue its voyage but the destination is changed to the nearby port of Bilbao.
