= Hassan Jandoubi =

Suspected French terrorist (1966–2001)

Hassan Jandoubi was a French national (born 1 March 1966, Toulouse - 21 September 2001, Toulouse) of Tunisian parents, who died on 21 September 2001, in the AZF chemical factory explosion in Toulouse in south-western France. He was subsequently investigated by French anti-terrorist authorities as the prime suspect in the blast. An official enquiry later determined the blast was accidental, and not a result of Jandoubi's actions.

== Early life ==
Jandoubi had been known to French police as the suspected ringleader of a gang trafficking stolen cars between France and Germany. He became an active member of a mosque in the Toulouse suburbs where he was "initiated to fundamentalism".

He was known by locals and police to be part of a gang seen celebrating the September 11 terror attacks, however, at the time of his death his name wasn't included on lists of fundamental terrorist suspects maintained by Interpol, the French intelligence service or the counter-espionage agency DST.

Jandoubi was hired to unload ammonium nitrate at the AZF plant by a subcontractor five days before the explosion. He was already known to local police for possible Islamic fundamentalist sympathies and was involved in several angry altercations before the blast with co-workers who were displaying the U.S. flag in sympathy with victims of the September 11 attacks.

== Blast ==
At 10:17 on 21 September 2001, ten days after the 9/11 attacks, a massive explosion destroyed the entire AZF facility in Toulouse, killing 29 people, injuring over 3,000 people and damaging 10,000 buildings, including nearby schools, hospitals, businesses and homes. The explosion measured 3.5 on the Richter scale and windows were blown out over five kilometres away from the epicenter. 1,400 families were left homeless. The blast released an ammonia cloud that eventually settled on nearby suburbs sending many more to hospital. On the day of the blast, Jandoubi was working in hangar 10, 30 metres from hangar 221 whose stock of 200-300 tonnes of ammonium nitrate exploded.

== Investigation ==
French Police and investigators were initially intrigued by the fact that Jandoubi was found with a mobile phone fitted with a stolen SIM card. Media interest was further aroused by the results of his autopsy, which was carried out by a doctor who had worked in the Middle East for the international aid organisation Médecins du Monde. The medical examiner noted that Jandoubi was wearing two pairs of trousers and four pairs of underpants, which reminded her "of the apparel worn by some Islamic militants going into battle or on suicide missions".

Media reports in France heavily reported the fact he was dressed in several layers of garments, and described how they were arranged "in the manner of kamikaze fundamentalists."

The chief prosecutor, Michel Breard, barred police and investigators from searching Jandoubi's apartment for five days after the explosion. When the apartment was finally entered, it was found cleaned out of his clothes, personal effects and photos. His girlfriend living in the apartment stated she had destroyed his belongings in order to better overcome the tragedy.

Ten seconds before the major explosion, witnesses reported a primary explosion and many personnel electrocutions in the AZF facility. Jandoubi's body was found deeply burnt but not his clothes. Furthermore, the colour of his eyes was blue instead of their natural black colour. An alternative hypothesis concerning Jandoubi's death could be electrocution and not a suicide attack. The current flowing through his body but not through his clothes burnt him internally and his blue eyes could be an electric cataract.
