= 2004 French train bomb extortion scheme =

In February 2004, extortion letters were sent to the French government that threatened to place explosives along the nation's rail lines unless millions of Euros were paid. The letters were claimed to be from a group called AZF, a name believed to have been derived from the explosion of the 2001 AZF chemical factory in Toulouse. Authorities were directed to discover a bomb as evidence of the seriousness of the intent, and a second deactivated bomb was found the next month. The French government claimed to have logistical difficulties in arranging the payment. After experiencing difficulty collecting the money and following an apparently unrelated train bombings in Spain on 11 March 2004, the schemers said the group was temporarily suspending its threats, and disappeared without further action.

In February 2024, a 76-year-old man was convicted of having made the bombs himself and leading the extortion scheme, assisted by one female accomplice. He said there had never really been an AZF group and that he was a self-trained inventor who came up with the extortion scheme as a way to finance his development of ecologically motivated inventions.

== Actions and incidents ==
The plot was an attempt to extort money in February 2004 from the French government by threatening to place explosives along the nation's rail lines. The threat was backed up by leading French railway workers to locate a bomb hidden on a viaduct near Limoges, allowing it to be neutralized. The police said the bomb was "sophisticated, worthy of an explosives expert".

The French government claimed that the government helicopter was unable to find the transfer point for payment of the demanded money. The French government then placed ads in the newspaper Libération to contact the plotters. Upon being contacted in March 2005 by phone by a woman claiming to represent the group and again demanding payment and threatening a similar outcome to the train bombings in Spain that occurred earlier in the month, the government responded that the weather conditions were not suitable for the second demanded attempt of payment delivery, and the caller said they would call back later.

A letter was received later that month that said the group was temporarily suspending their threats.

On 24 March 2004, a second bomb was found, along train tracks in Montieramey, near Troyes, about 200 kilometres (120 miles) southeast of Paris along the route to Basel. However, the second bomb was not armed and although it "strongly resembled" the other bomb, officials said some aspects of its discovery "did not correspond to what was in the letters signed by AZF", so they were unsure at the time whether this second bomb was made by the same person or group.

The motivation was unclear at the time, other than simply wanting money. It was conjectured that they may have stopped their activity because of the train bombings in Madrid on 11 March 2004 that killed 193 people and injured around 2,500.

In February 2024, a man identified as Michel D. (full name not released), age 76 in 2024, was convicted of making the bombs himself and leading the extortion scheme, assisted by one female accomplice, Perrine R. (full name not released), age 61. Michel D. was sentenced to 5 years in prison, one year of which was suspended, and his accomplice was sentenced to 3 years in prison, two years of which were suspended. Michele D. said he was ecologically motivated and had hoped to use the money to finance his invention and development of technology relating to energy and water purification.
