= Port Neal fertilizer plant explosion =

1994 industrial disaster at Port Neal Complex, Iowa

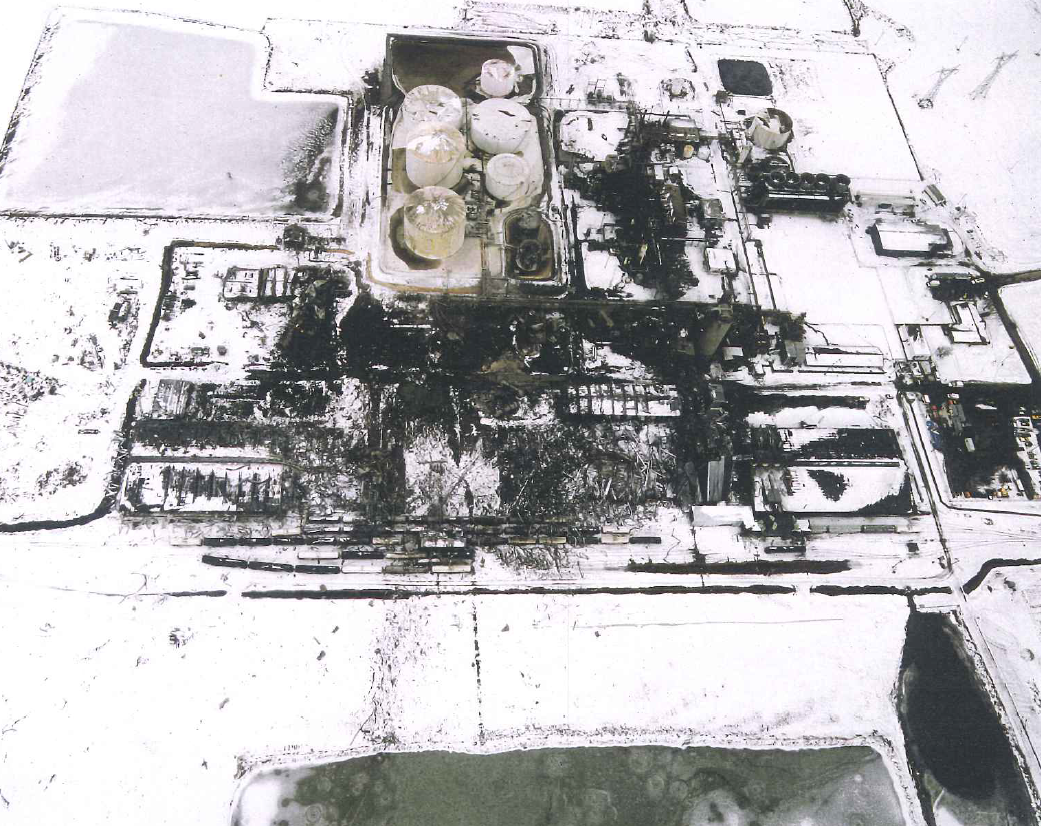
- Aerial photograph of the Port Neal Complex following the explosion.
- Date: December 13, 1994
- Time: 6:06 a.m. CST (UTC−06:00)
- Location: Terra Chemicals International, Port Neal Complex, Woodbury County, Iowa, United States; 42.331°N 96.379°W
- Cause: Thermal decomposition of ammonium nitrate solution due to unsafe operating procedures.
- Deaths: 4
- Injuries: 18
- Property damage: $321 million

The Port Neal fertilizer plant explosion occurred on December 13, 1994 in the ammonium nitrate plant at the Terra International, Inc., Port Neal Complex, 16 mi (26 km) south of Sioux City, Iowa, United States. Four workers at the plant were killed by the explosion, and 18 others were injured. The seven-story building at the seat of the blast was completely destroyed, leaving only a crater, and significant damage was inflicted to the surrounding structures. Four nearby electricity generating stations were disabled by the explosion, and the effects of the blast were felt up to 30 miles away. A high-voltage line running adjacent to the plant and over the Missouri River was damaged, disrupting power in the neighboring state of Nebraska. Two 15,000-ton refrigerated ammonia storage tanks were ruptured, releasing liquid ammonia and ammonia vapors which forced the evacuation of 1,700 residents from the surrounding area.

== Causes of explosion ==
An investigation conducted by the United States Environmental Protection Agency (EPA) concluded in 1996 that the explosion was initiated by an accelerated thermal decomposition reaction as "a direct result of unsafe operating procedures and conditions" at the plant. The investigation team concluded that the explosion resulted from a lack of written, safe operation procedures at the Terra Port Neal ammonium nitrate plant. The lack of safe operating procedures resulted in conditions in the plant that were necessary for the explosion to occur. The significant conditions that caused the explosion were:

1. Strongly acidic conditions in the neutralizer and rundown tank;
2. Prolonged application of 200 psig steam to the neutralizer nitric acid spargers;
3. The creation of bubbles and low density zones in the neutralizer;
4. Lack of flow in the neutralizer and rundown tank;
5. The presence of chlorides, from a cooling water leak, in the neutralizer and rundown tank;
6. Lack of monitoring of the ammonium nitrate plant after the plant was shut down with the process vessels charged.

The EPA had conducted a safety audit at the plant just eight months prior to the explosion. The plant was Iowa's largest producer of nitrogen-based fertilizers and its loss contributed to a national 50% increase in the cost of fertilizer by the following year.

== See also ==
- Ammonium nitrate disasters
