= Texas City disaster =

1947 explosions in Texas City, Texas

Texas City Disaster
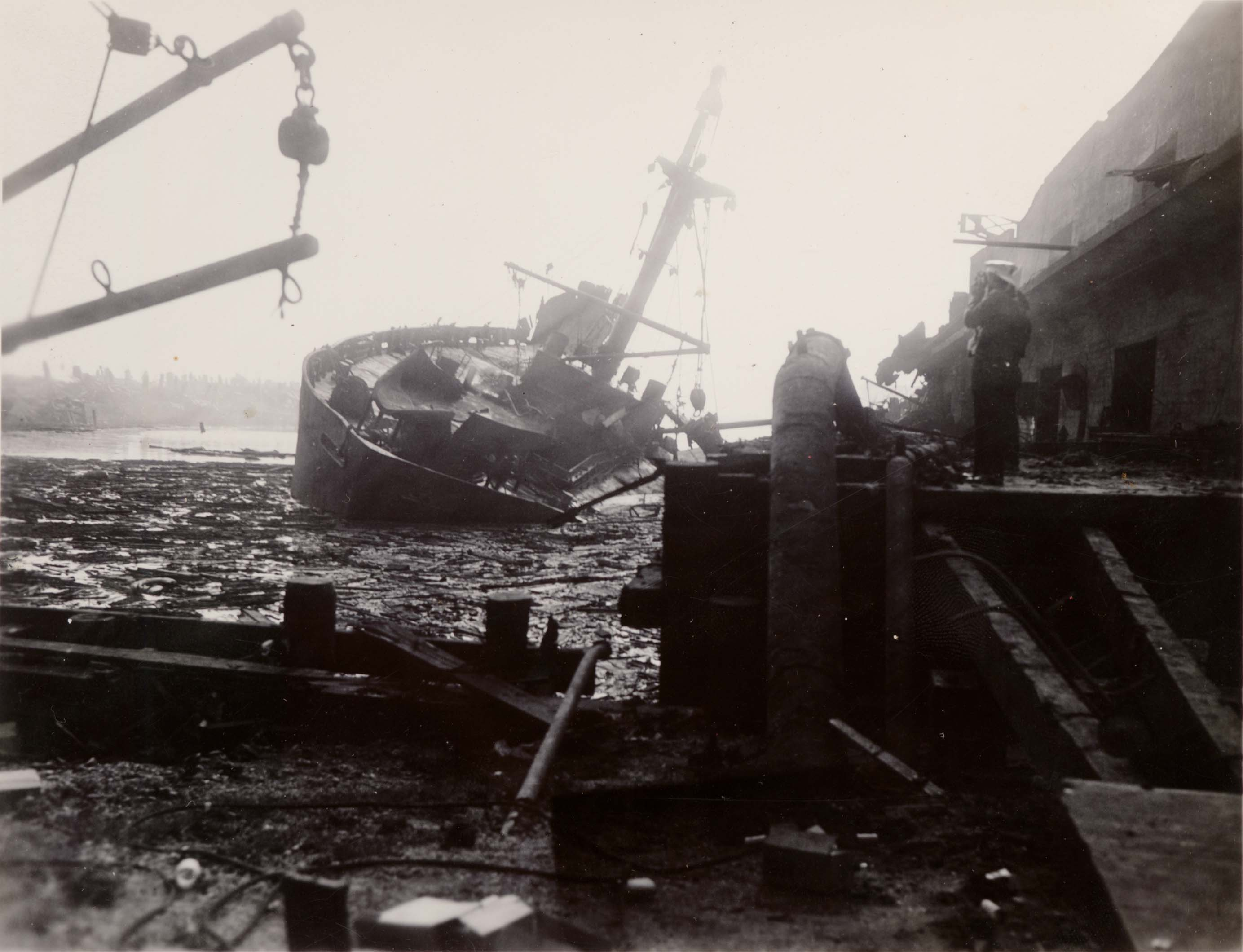
- SS Wilson B. Keene, destroyed in the disaster's second explosion
- Date: 16 April 1947; 79 years ago
- Time: 9:12 am (CST)
- Location: Texas City, Texas, United States; 29°22′39″N 94°53′29″W
- Type: Ammonium nitrate explosion
- Deaths: 581
- Injuries: 5000

The Texas City disaster was an industrial accident that occurred on April 16, 1947, in the port of Texas City, Texas, United States, located in Galveston Bay. It was the deadliest industrial accident in U.S. history and one of history's largest non-nuclear explosions.

The explosion was triggered by a mid-morning fire on board the French-registered vessel Grandcamp (docked at port), which detonated her cargo of about 2,300 short tons (2,100 metric tons) of ammonium nitrate. This started a chain reaction of fires and explosions aboard other ships and in nearby oil-storage facilities, ultimately killing at least 581 people, including all but one member of Texas City's volunteer fire department.

The disaster drew the first class-action lawsuit against the United States government, on behalf of 8,485 plaintiffs, under the 1946 Federal Tort Claims Act. The case eventually reached the Supreme Court in Dalehite v. United States.

== Background ==
=== Geography ===
The Port of Texas City is located in a protected harbor inland from Galveston, with relatively straight access to the Gulf of Mexico. The port expanded greatly during World War II, as many wartime chemical and oil plants were located in or near the city. In 1946, some 4,000 ships loaded or unloaded cargo in the port. The nearest neighborhood was only 0.5 miles (0.80 km) away from the site of the explosion. Within 1 mile (1.6 km) there were six major chemical or oil companies, nine piers, eleven warehouses, a grain elevator, and many homes.

While oil and chemicals had been the major export, the port also began shipping ammonium nitrate in 1945. The ammonium nitrate, needed either as fertilizer or an explosive, was manufactured in Nebraska and Iowa and shipped to Texas City by rail before being loaded onto ships. The dedicated Texas City Terminal Railway provided final mile service directly to the port. Export of ammonium nitrate increased significantly in the postwar years as ammunition manufacturing was converted into fertilizer manufacturing, to be sent for export to rebuild war-torn Europe.

=== Ships ===
SS Grandcamp was a recently re-activated 437-foot-long (133 m) Liberty ship. Originally named SS Benjamin R. Curtis in Los Angeles in 1942, the ship served in the Pacific theater and was mothballed in Philadelphia after the war. Following World War 2, the ship was assigned by the U.S. to the French Line to assist in the rebuilding of France, along with other efforts in Europe. Accordingly, she was captained by a French crew led by Captain Charles de Guillebon. Along with the ammonium nitrate—a very common cargo on the high seas—she was carrying small-arms ammunition, machinery, and bales of sisal twine on the deck. Her engine was undergoing repairs while docked and thus the ship was inoperable.

Another ship in the harbor, SS High Flyer, was docked about 600 feet (200 m) away from Grandcamp. The ammonium nitrate aboard the two ships, and fertilizer in an adjacent warehouse, were intended for export to farmers in Europe. Grandcamp had arrived from Houston, where the port authority did not permit the loading of ammonium nitrate.

=== Cargo ===
Grandcamp had a mixed cargo, containing chiefly ammonium nitrate, but also twine, peanuts, tobacco, some small arms ammunition, engineering equipment, and cotton. The ammonium nitrate was manufactured in a patented process, mixed with clay, petrolatum, rosin and paraffin wax to avoid moisture caking. It was packaged in 100 pounds (45 kg) paper sacks. Longshoremen reported the bags were warm to the touch before loading.

High Flyer held an additional 961 short tons (872 t) of ammonium nitrate and 2,000 short tons (1,800 metric tons) of sulfur.

Grandcamp arrived in port on April 11, 1947, and began loading 2,500 short tons (2,300 t) of fertilizer on April 14, which were to be sent to France. The storage deck of Grandcamp was divided into five storage holds, with a fuel oil bunker located between Hold 3 and Hold 4. The fertilizer was to be added to Hold 2 and Hold 4. The loading continued until interrupted by rain on the evening of the 15th. Loading was set to continue on the morning of the 16th, with the last 600 short tons (540 t) set to be loaded into the partially full Hold 4.

== Fire ==
On Wednesday, April 16, 1947, around 8 a.m., smoke was spotted in the cargo hold of Grandcamp while it was still moored. Longshoremen used a gallon jug of water and two fire extinguishers, but they had no effect and the cargo hold filled with smoke. The longshoremen were then ordered to leave the hold. At this point, the captain of Grandcamp ordered that no water be used, lest the cargo be ruined. Instead, he ordered all hatches sealed and the hold to be filled with steam in an attempt to smother the fire. This was unlikely to be effective, as ammonium nitrate is an oxidizer, thus neutralizing the extinguishing properties of steam. The steam may have contributed to the fire by converting the ammonium nitrate to nitrous oxide, while augmenting the already intense heat in the ship's hold. Around 8:30 a.m. the stevedores who were fighting the fire were ordered off the ship, likely because the heat had become too intense and there were concerns that the small arms ammunition could cook off.

While the port had fire hydrants, it lacked its own fire engines. A call for outside help was sent at 8:37. Responding fire departments included the Texas City volunteer fire department and the Republic Oil Refining Company firefighting team. As crews fought the fire, the hatch on Hold 4 blew off from the pressure of the steam. A column of yellow-orange smoke billowed out, the typical color for nitrogen dioxide fumes. The fire and its unusual-looking smoke attracted a crowd of about 500 spectators (including many children) along the shoreline, who believed they were at a safe distance. Around 9:00, the fire abated slightly, but the steam suppression system was still actively heating Hold 4. Most of the crew had disembarked the ship, and Captain Guillebon was taking a headcount on the pier.

== First explosion ==
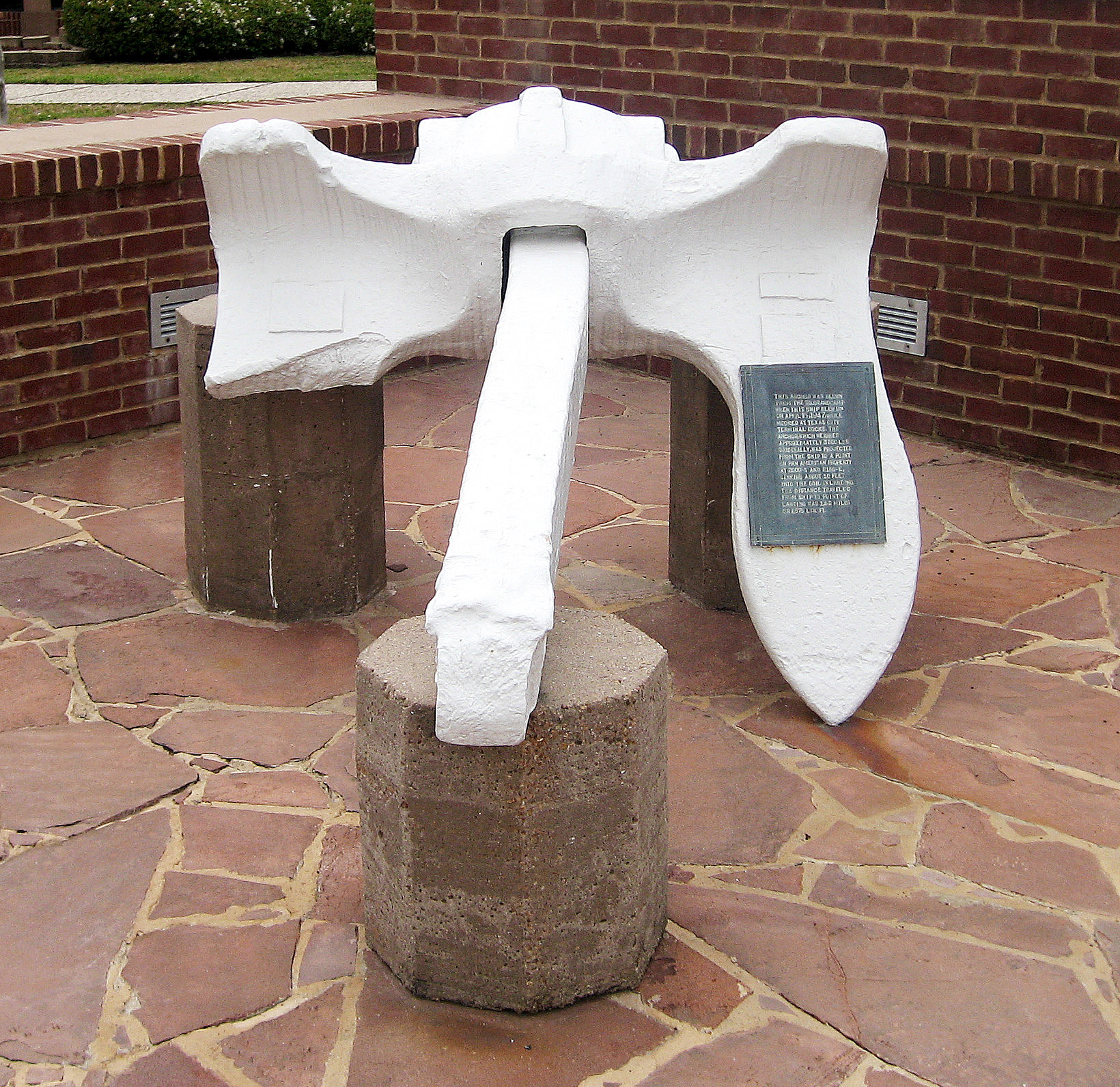
This 2-ton anchor was thrown more than 1.6 miles when Grandcamp exploded.

At 9:12 a.m., the ammonium nitrate reached an explosive threshold and Grandcamp detonated. The exact cause is unknown, but the likeliest explanation is that the heat of the fire caused the fuel oil bunker adjacent to Hold 4 to split, pouring fuel onto the hot, decomposing fertilizer, creating an impromptu ANFO mixture that was susceptible to detonation. Grandcamp was entirely obliterated. The resulting explosion caused utter destruction within 2,000 feet (610 m) and extreme damage throughout the port. The tremendous blast produced a 15 ft (4.6 m) tsunami and a shockwave, levelling nearly 1,000 buildings. The tsunami was responsible for a significant portion of onlooker deaths.

Flying shrapnel resulted in ignition of refineries and chemical tanks along the waterfront. Falling bales of burning twine from Grandcamp's cargo added to the damage, and her anchor was hurled across the city. Two sightseeing airplanes flying nearby were blown out of the sky, while 8 miles (13 km) away, half of the windows in Galveston were shattered. The explosion blew almost 6,350 short tons (5,760 t) of the ship's steel into the air, some at supersonic speed.

The Monsanto Chemical Company plant adjacent to the slip where Grandcamp was docked suffered the brunt of the first explosion. Of its 574 employees and contractors, 234 were killed, and 200 more were injured. Every man of the Monsanto fire fighting team, which was laying hose reels opposite Grandcamp, was killed.

The exact damage caused by the first explosion is not fully ascertainable, as the second explosion wreaked further havoc and came before a survey of the damage could be done.

Seven ruptured oil tanks at the Republic Refinery began to burn, letting off thick clouds of black smoke. Burning sulfur in a dockside warehouse created acrid fumes.

Official casualty estimates came to a total of 567, including all the crewmen who remained aboard Grandcamp. All but one member of the 28-man Texas City volunteer fire department were killed in the initial explosion on the docks while fighting the shipboard fire. With fires raging throughout Texas City, first responders from other areas were initially unable to reach the site of the disaster.

Still, 112 people within 500 ft (150 m) of Grandcamp survived, including many witnesses who would allow for later reconstruction of the events.

== Second explosion ==
The first explosion had set Highflyer free from its moorings, and it had drifted across the harbor, coming to rest against SS Wilson B. Keene. Her crew stayed aboard for an hour before the smoke of the burning oil and sulfur forced them to leave. In the afternoon, two men boarded Highflyer searching for injured crewmembers. They noted that her cargo was ablaze and reported it to someone on the harborfront. This message seems to have gone unheeded for several hours until it was realized that this indicated a serious problem. Only around 11 p.m. did tugboats attempt to pull Highflyer away from the docks. Despite having cut her anchor, they were unable to move her. They fled the area around 1 a.m. the next day (April 17). Ten minutes later, at 1:10 a.m., Highflyer exploded, killing two more people. According to witnesses, the explosion was more powerful than that of Grandcamp. Casualties were light since the docks had already been evacuated, but the second explosion exacerbated the damage to nearby ships and buildings. The blast destroyed the nearby Wilson B. Keene. The steel frame of Highflyer had been heated until glowing, and these chunks rained down upon Texas City setting mass fires. One of the propellers was blown off and subsequently found nearly a mile inland. It is now in a memorial park near the anchor of Grandcamp.

== Scale of the disaster ==
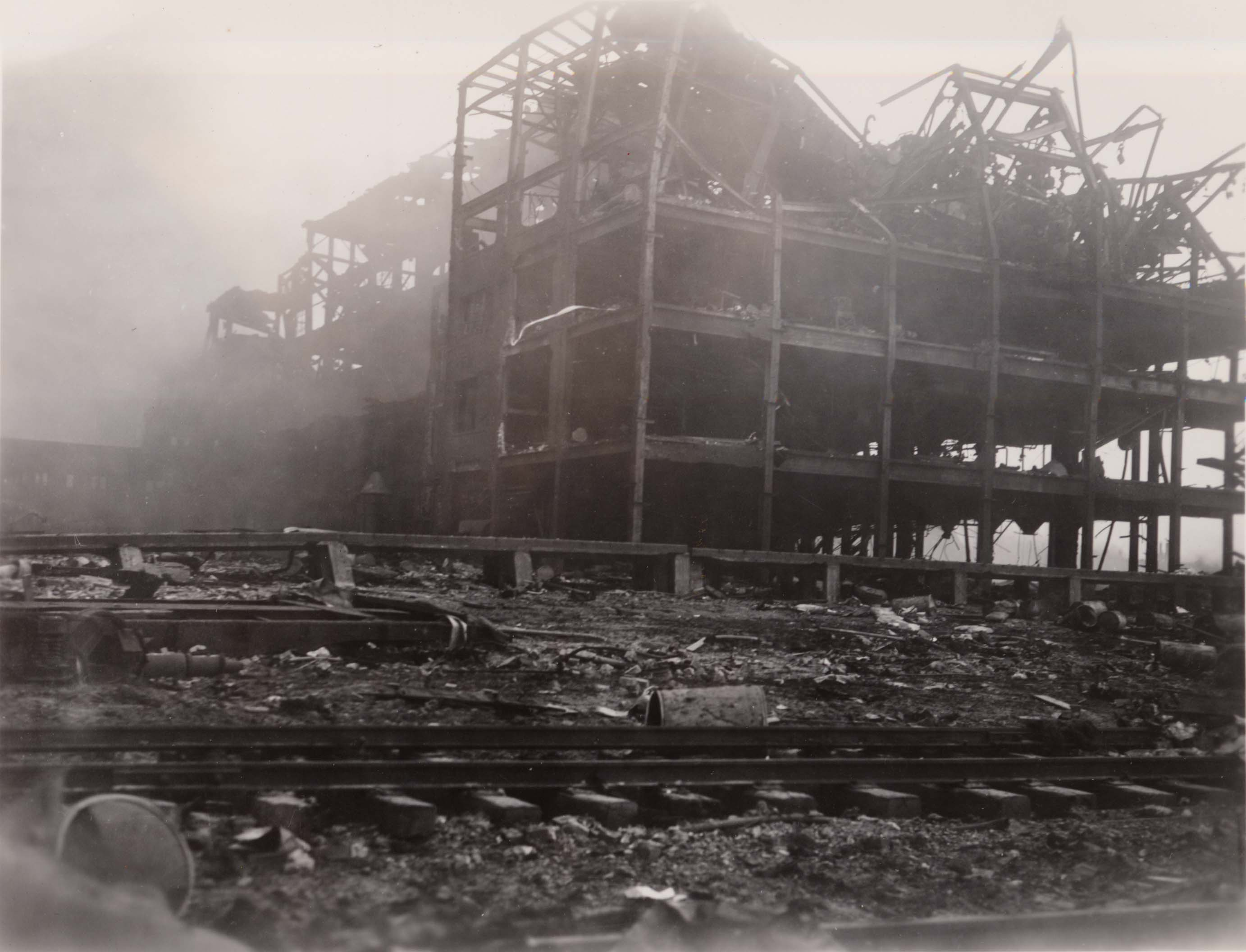
A five-story rubber factory beside slip #1

The Texas City disaster is generally considered the worst industrial accident in U.S. history. Witnesses compared the scene to the fairly recent images of the 1943 air raid on Bari and the much larger devastation after an atomic bomb was dropped at Nagasaki.

Of the dead, 405 were identified and 63 have never been identified. The latter remains were placed in a memorial cemetery in the north part of Texas City near Moses Lake. An additional 113 people were classified as missing, for whom no identifiable parts were ever found. This figure includes firefighters who were aboard Grandcamp when she exploded. There is some speculation that there were hundreds more killed but uncounted, including visiting seamen, undocumented laborers and their families, and an untold number of travelers. More than 800 people were left orphaned or widowed. However, there were also some survivors among people as close as 70 feet (21 m) from the dock. The victims' bodies quickly filled the local morgue. Several bodies were laid out in the local high school's gymnasium for identification by family or friends.

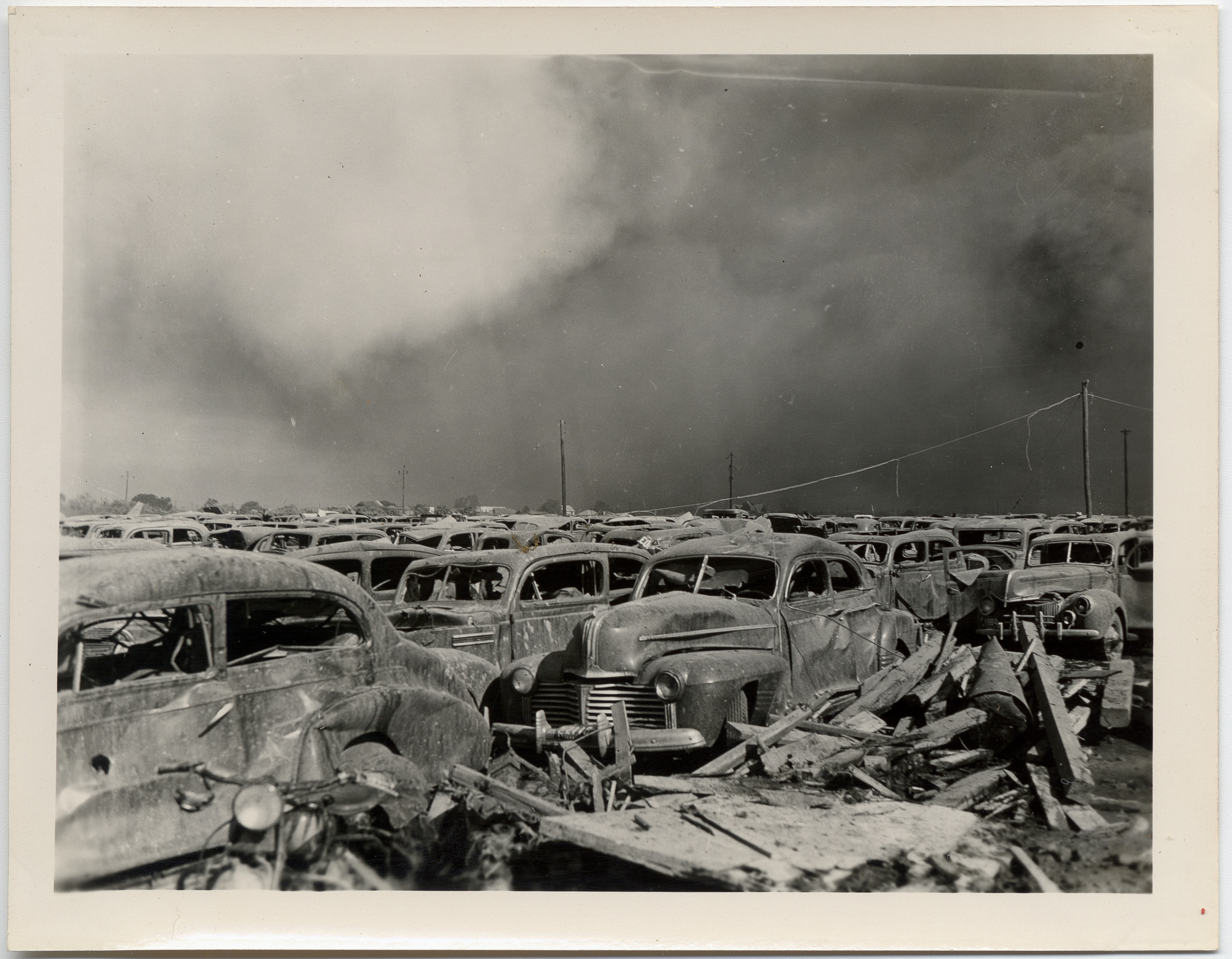
Parking lot 1/4 mile (400 m) away from the explosion

More than 5,000 people were injured, with 1,784 admitted to 21 area hospitals. More than 500 homes were destroyed and hundreds damaged, leaving 2,000 homeless. The seaport was destroyed, and many businesses were flattened or burned. Over 1,100 vehicles were damaged and 362 freight cars were obliterated; the property damage was estimated at $100 million (equivalent to $1.100×10^{9} in 2024). This number may not encompass the full scope of damage: a further $500 million of oil products burned (equivalent to $5.499×10^{9} in 2024).

A 2-short-ton (1.8-metric-ton) anchor of Grandcamp was hurled 1.62 miles (2.61 km) and found in a 10-foot (3 m) crater. It was installed at a memorial park. The other main 5-short-ton (4.5-metric-ton) anchor was hurled 1/2 mile (800 m) to the entrance of the Texas City Dike. It rests on a "Texas-shaped" memorial at the entrance. Burning wreckage ignited everything within miles, including dozens of oil and chemical tanks. The nearby city of Galveston was covered with an oily fog that left deposits over every exposed outdoor surface.

== Firefighting casualties ==
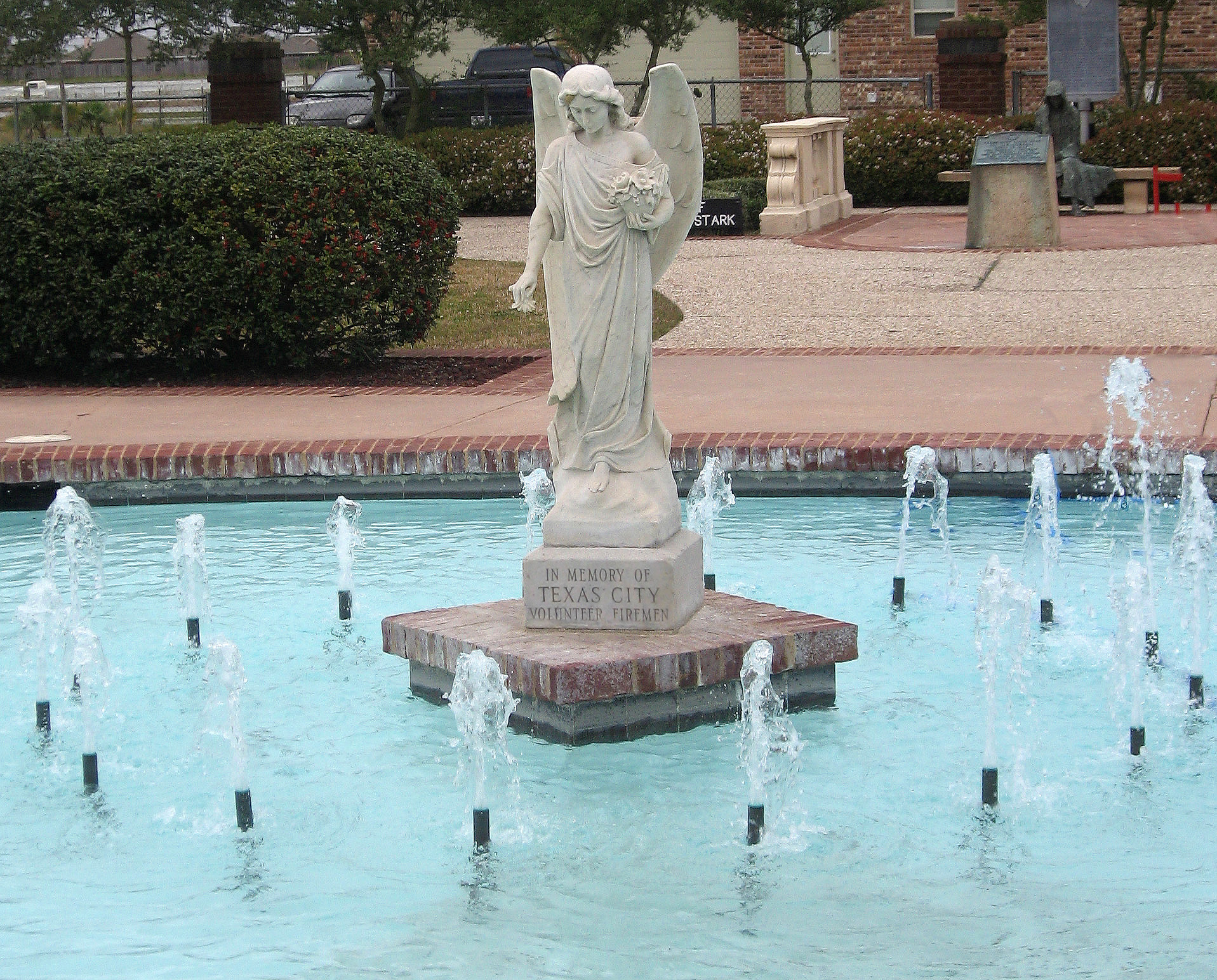
Texas City Disaster Firemen Memorial

Some of the deaths and damage in Texas City were due to the destruction and subsequent burning of several chemical plants (including Monsanto and Union Carbide), oil storage, and other facilities near the explosions. Twenty-seven of Texas City's twenty-eight volunteer firemen, and three of the four Texas City Heights volunteer firemen on the docks near the burning ship were killed. One firefighter, Fred Dowdy, who had not responded to the initial call, coordinated other firefighters arriving from communities up to 60 miles (100 km) away. Alvin Fussell, the sole surviving Heights firefighter, was driving to work in Alvin when he heard of the fire on the radio. Eventually 200 firefighters arrived from as far away as Los Angeles. Fires resulting from the cataclysmic events were still burning a week after the disaster, and the process of body recovery took nearly a month. All four Texas City fire engines were twisted and burned husks.

== Cause ==
The cause of the initial fire aboard Grandcamp was never determined. It may have been started by a cigarette discarded the previous day, meaning the ship's cargo had been smoldering throughout the night when the fire was discovered on the morning of the explosion. Historian Hugh Stephens later identified human error as the cause, and cites numerous reasons as to why a minor fire became such a severe incident.

Stephens identifies as root causes the expansion of the port, the proximity of dangerous port operations to the rest of Texas City, a lack of community awareness of the danger posed by chemical hazards, and a lack of safety preparation.

Smoking was commonplace at the time. While officially prohibited at the port, such prohibitions were not enforced and smoking was widespread.

Stephens notes that in interviews and written accounts, few residents of Texas City seemed to understand the danger of the port, as exemplified by the large crowd that assembled to watch Grandcamp burn. Stephens suggests that in an era before disasters like Bhopal (1984), or Superfund legislation (1986), the sense of danger from chemicals was amorphous. "Before the accident, Texas City's citizens felt secure because such a disaster had never happened and they could therefore assume it never would." (The even more devastating Halifax explosion of 1917, in the port of Halifax, Nova Scotia, involved the explosives TNT and picric acid). Stephens also points out that Texas City was a boomtown in a time when the rest of the country was still recovering from the Great Depression, in which most of the city owed its prosperity to the oil and chemical industry, which may have further led to lax attitudes.

The danger of ammonium nitrate may not have been well known at the time. While Army manuals classified it as a high explosive, general belief (and even guidance from the Department of Agriculture) held that fertilizer was not dangerous under typical conditions. However, the danger was not unknown. The Port of Houston had forbidden the loading of fertilizer in 1946.

In the months before the disaster, local Catholic priest William F. Roach remarked on the concerning industrial conditions by stating "I feel like I’m sitting on a keg of dynamite." Roach was killed having driven to the waterfront to help after noticing smoke.

Neither the Port of Texas City, the Texas City Terminal Railway, the City itself, nor any of the oil refineries, had a disaster preparedness plan—which even at the time was regarded as inadequate. The Port itself had no Port authority that could regulate both land and sea operations. Thus, safety was fragmented between companies and between land and sea. The end of military supervision at the end of the war also played a role. Safety authority should have transferred from the military back to the United States Coast Guard, but the Coast Guard failed to take preventative actions and safety instead returned to the hands of private parties. Texas City also failed to police or regulate the dock; such matters were left to security hired by the Terminal Railway.

== Reactions and rebuilding ==
The disaster received national media attention, with offers of assistance coming from around the country. Several funds were established to handle donations, particularly the Texas City Relief Fund, created by the city's mayor Curtis Trahan. One of the largest fundraising efforts for the city and the victims of the disaster was organized by Sam Maceo, one of the two brothers who ran organized crime in Galveston at the time. Maceo organized a large-scale benefit on the island, featuring entertainers including Phil Harris, Frank Sinatra, and Ann Sheridan. In the end, the Texas City Relief Fund raised more than $1 million ($15.3 million in today's terms). Payouts for fire insurance claims reached nearly $4 million ($57 million in today's terms).

Within days of the disaster, major companies that had lost facilities in the explosions announced plans to rebuild in Texas City and in some cases to expand their operations. Some companies implemented policies of retaining all of the hourly workers who had previously worked at destroyed facilities with plans to use them in the rebuilding. Cost estimates of the industrial reconstruction were estimated at approximately $100 million ($1.44 billion adjusted for inflation).

"Commemorating the 50th Anniversary of the explosion [...], just as the Phoenix bird symbolizes resurrection from the ashes of despair, the 'Phoenix Fountain' epitomizes courage and the triumph of the human spirit. [...] Chewelah, Washington Artist David Govedare was commissioned by Mayor Charles T. Doyle [...] [to] produce this twelve foot sculpture from half inch cor-ten steel. Architect Joseph Allen Hoover and City Engineer James McWhorter designed the fountain built by Texas City's Public Works Department."

== Legal case ==
Many of the legal cases seeking compensation were combined into Elizabeth Dalehite, et al. v. United States, under the recently enacted Federal Tort Claims Act (FTCA). On April 13, 1950, the district court found the United States government responsible for a litany of negligent acts of omission and commission by 168 named agencies and their representatives, in the manufacture, packaging, and labeling of ammonium nitrate. This was further compounded by errors in transport, storage, loading, fire prevention, and fire suppression, all of which led to the explosions and the subsequent carnage.

On June 10, 1952, the U.S. Fifth Circuit Court of Appeals overturned this decision, finding that the United States maintained the right to exercise its own "discretion" in vital national matters. The U.S. Supreme Court affirmed that decision (346 U.S. 15, June 8, 1953), in a 4-to-3 opinion, noting that the district court had no jurisdiction under the federal statute to find the government liable for "negligent planning decisions" which were properly delegated to various departments and agencies. In short, the FTCA clearly exempts "failure to exercise or perform a discretionary function or duty", and the court found that all of the alleged acts in this case were discretionary in nature.

In its dissent, the three justices argued that, under the FTCA, "Congress has defined the tort liability of the government as analogous to that of a private person", i.e., when carrying out duties unrelated to governing. In this case, "a policy adopted in the exercise of an immune discretion was carried out carelessly by those in charge of detail", and that a private person would certainly be held liable for such acts. A private person is held to a higher standard of care when carrying out "inherently dangerous" acts such as transportation and storage of explosives.

According to Melvin Belli in his book Ready for the Plaintiff! (1965), Congress acted to provide some compensation after the courts refused to do so. Dalehite was eventually "appealed" to Congress, where relief was granted by means of legislation (Public Law 378, 69 Stat. 707 (1955)). When the last claim had been processed in 1957, 1,394 awards totaling nearly $17 million had been made.

== See also ==
- Halifax explosion (1917)
- List of ammonium nitrate disasters
  - Oppau explosion (1921)
  - West Fertilizer Company explosion in West, Texas (2013)
  - Tianjin explosions (2015)
  - Beirut explosion (2020)
- Largest artificial non-nuclear explosions
