= List of ammonium nitrate incidents and disasters =

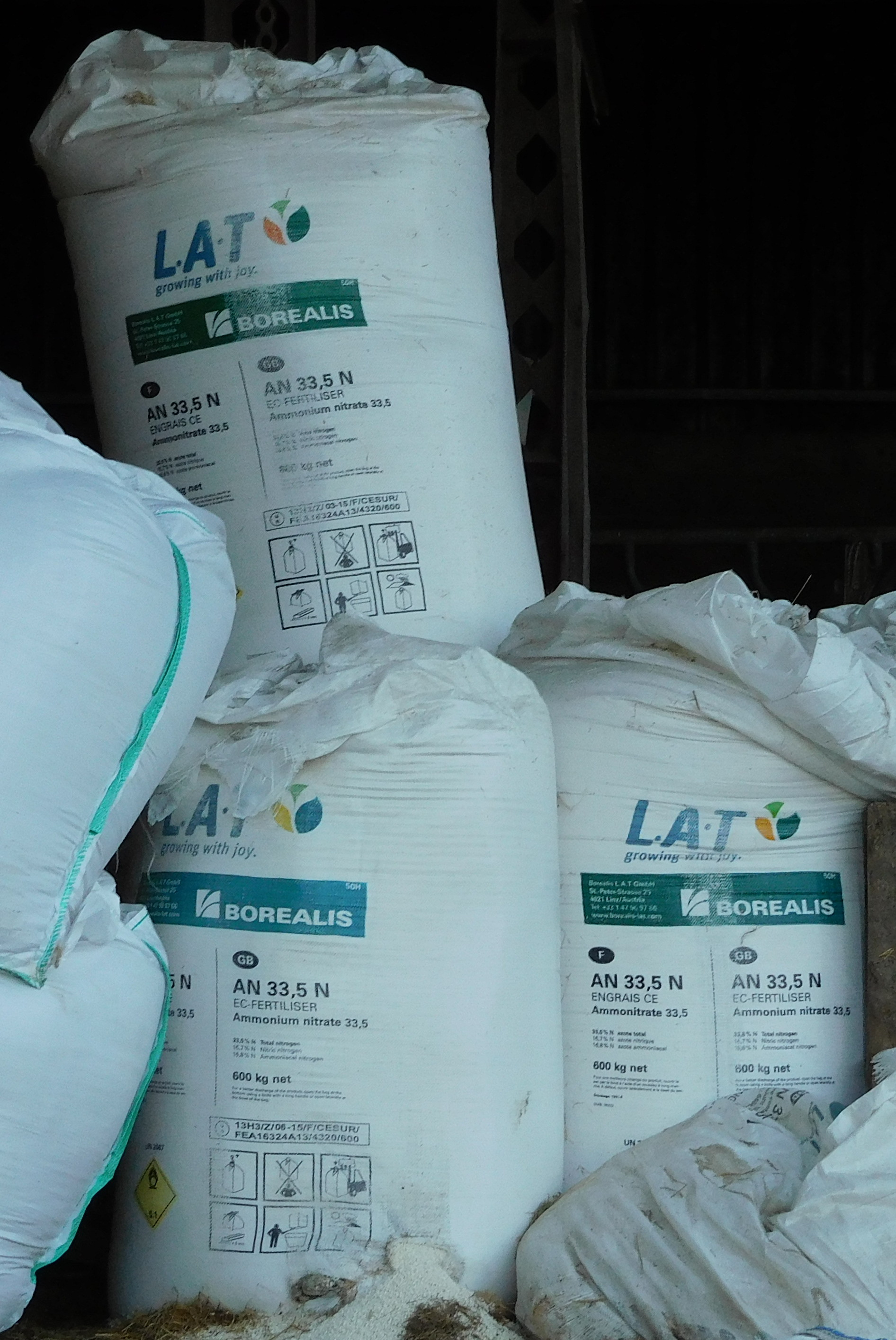
Bags of ammonium nitrate fertilizer

When heated, ammonium nitrate decomposes non-explosively into nitrous oxide and water vapor; however, it can be induced to decompose explosively by detonation into oxygen, nitrogen, and water vapor. Large stockpiles of the material can be a major fire risk due to their supporting oxidation, and may also detonate, as happened in the Texas City disaster of 1947 which led to major changes in the regulations for storage and handling.

There are two major classes of incidents resulting in explosions:

- In the first case, the explosion happens by the shock induced detonation. The initiation happens by an explosive charge going off in the mass, by the detonation of a shell thrown into the mass, or by detonation of an explosive mixture in contact with the mass. Examples are Kriewald, Morgan, Oppau, Tessenderlo, and Traskwood.
- In the second case, the explosion results from a fire that spreads into the ammonium nitrate (AN) itself (Texas City, Brest, Tianjin, Beirut) or to a mixture of an ammonium nitrate with a combustible material during the fire. The fire must be confined at least to a degree for successful transition from a fire to an explosion (a phenomenon known as "deflagration to detonation transition", or DDT). Pure, compact AN is stable and very difficult to initiate.

Ammonium nitrate decomposes in temperatures above 169 °C (336 °F). Pure AN is stable and will stop decomposing once the heat source is removed, but when catalysts are present, the reaction can become self-sustaining (known as self-sustaining decomposition, or SSD). This is a well-known hazard with some types of NPK fertilizers and is responsible for the loss of several cargo ships.

== Timeline of major incidents ==
The column AN states the amount of ammonium nitrate consumed in the disaster in metric tonnes.

| Country | Location | Date | Deaths | AN (t) | Notes |
|---|---|---|---|---|---|
| United States | Gibbstown, New Jersey | 14 January 1916 | 1 | 1.81 | In an evaporating pan of the Repauno works, du Pont Co., 1,800 kilograms (4,000 lb) of ammonium nitrate exploded, possibly caused by a clogged air lance leading to overheating of the nitrate. 1 man was killed and 12 were injured. |
| United Kingdom | Faversham, Kent | 2 April 1916 | 115 | 700 | The Great Explosion: On 2 April 1916, at 14:20, a factory in Uplees, Faversham, exploded after a fire spread to a store of 25 tons of TNT and 700 tons of ammonium nitrate. The blast at the Explosives Loading Company killed 115 people and shattered windows in Southend-on-Sea across the Thames Estuary while the tremor was felt in Norwich. |
| United States | Oakdale, Pennsylvania | 15 September 1916 | 6 | 1.36 | An Aetna Chemical Company plant suffered an explosion of 1,400 kilograms (3,000 lb) of ammonium nitrate, while concentrating it in a pan by evaporation. The speculated cause was impurities within the nitric acid used to produce the ammonium nitrate. Six men were killed and eight injured. The shock wave was felt at a distance of 11 kilometres (7 mi). |
| Germany | Kriewald | 26 July 1921 | 19 | 30 | Knurow (Kriewald). On 26 July 1921, in this railway town (now in Poland) workers tried to dislodge 30 tonnes of ammonium nitrate that had aggregated (solidified into one mass) in two wagons. When mining explosives were used on this solid mass the wagons exploded and killed nineteen people. |
| Germany | Oppau | 21 September 1921 | 561 | 450 | Explosion at BASF plant Oppau: Another attempt at disaggregation of a fertilizer mix with industrial explosives caused the death of 561 people and left more than 2,000 injured. The explosion happened at 7:32 a.m. The fertilizer was a 50:50 mixture of ammonium nitrate and ammonium sulfate and the factory had used this method of disaggregation over 20,000 times without incident. It is thought that, on this occasion, poor mixing had led to certain parts of the mass containing more ammonium nitrate than others. Only 450 tonnes exploded, out of 4500 tonnes of fertilizer stored in the warehouse. |
| United States | Nixon, New Jersey (now Edison Township) | 1 March 1924 | 20 | 2 | 1924 Nixon Nitration Works disaster: On 1 March 1924, at 11:15 a.m., a fire and several large explosions destroyed a warehouse containing 2,200 kilograms (4,800 lb) of ammonium nitrate at the Nixon Nitration Works. The explosiveness of the product was perhaps enhanced, as it had been prepared using nitric acid that had previously been used for the production of TNT. |
| United States | Muscle Shoals, Alabama | 3 May 1925 | 0 | | On 4 April 1925, and 3 May 1925, two carloads, each containing 220 barrels of ammonium nitrate, were dispatched from Muscle Shoals, Alabama, and caught fire in transportation. The barrels had been stored in a warehouse with varying humidity for 6 years, so it is believed that they were ignited by friction with their nitrate-impregnated manila paper lining. Other shipments were reportedly more successful. |
| France | Miramas | 5 August 1940 | 0 | 240 | 240 tonnes of ammonium nitrate in sacks exploded after being hit by a shell from a nearby fire in a munitions train. |
| Belgium | Tessenderlo | 29 April 1942 | 189 | 150 | An attempt to disaggregate a pile of 150 tonnes of ammonium nitrate with industrial explosives killed 189 people and wounded another 900. |
| United States | Texas City | 16 April 1947 | 581 | 2,086 + 870 | Texas City disaster: The cargo ship Grandcamp was being loaded on 16 April 1947, when a fire was detected in the hold: at this point, 2,300 tons of ammonium nitrate in sacks were already aboard. The captain responded by closing the hold and pumping in pressurised steam. At 9:12, the ship exploded, killing several hundred people and setting fire to another vessel, the High Flyer, which was moored 250 metres away and which contained 1,050 tonnes of sulfur and 960 tons of ammonium nitrate. The Grandcamp explosion also created a powerful earthshock that broke windows as far as 64 kilometres (40 mi) away and knocked two small planes flying at 460 metres (1,500 ft) out of the sky. The High Flyer exploded the next day, after having burned for sixteen hours. 500 tonnes of ammonium nitrate on the quayside also burned, but without exploding, probably because it was less tightly packed. All but one member of the Texas City fire department died. |
| France | Brest | 28 July 1947 | 29 | 1,700-3,309 | The Norwegian cargo ship Ocean Liberty was loaded with 3,309 tonnes of ammonium nitrate and various flammable products when it caught fire at 12:30 28 July 1947. The captain ordered the hold to be sealed and pressurised steam was pumped in. As this did not stop the fire, the vessel was towed out of the harbour at 14:00, and exploded at 17:00. The explosion caused 29 deaths and serious damage to the port of Brest. |
| United States | Presque Isle, Maine | 26 August 1947 | 0 | 217 | An A.W. Higgins Company plant was destroyed by a spontaneous heating in a pile of mixed fertilizer. Stored in the plant were 240 tons of ammonium nitrate. |
| Canada | St. Stephen, New Brunswick | 1947 | 0 | 360 | The Summers Fertilizer Company plant suffered a fire, causing 400 tons of stored ammonium nitrate to be consumed by fire. There was no explosion. |
| - | Red Sea | 23 January 1953 | 0 | | A fire was detected on the Finnish cargo ship Tirrenia on 23 January 1953, while it was carrying ammonium nitrate. Attempts to extinguish the fire with steam were unsuccessful, and the ship was abandoned before it exploded later in the night. |
| United States | Roseburg, Oregon | 7 August 1959 | 14 | 4.1 | The Roseburg Blast: A truck carrying dynamite and 4.5 tons of ammonium nitrate caught fire early in the morning of 7 August 1959. The explosion happened at 1:14 a.m. and killed 14 people and injured 125 more. Several blocks of downtown Roseburg were destroyed. The accident is locally referred to as "The Blast". |
| United States | Traskwood, Arkansas | 17 December 1960 | 0 | 140–180 | On 17 December 1960, a 96 freight car train suffered partial derailment, in which the last 23 cars were derailed. The derailed cars included: four fuel oil tank cars, two tank cars of gasoline, three tank cars of petroleum oil, four cars of lube oil drums, three cars of liquid fertilizer, one car of fuming nitric acid and two cars of fertilizer grade ammonium nitrate. In this particular accident, neither car of ammonium nitrate exploded. However, the nitric acid reacted with the fuel oil, possibly creating nitrated aromatic compounds, whose explosion resulted in the spread of the ammonium nitrate material around the incident site. |
| Finland | Oulu | 9 January 1963 | 10 | 10 | On 9 January 1963, an explosion at the Typpi Oy industrial site in the Takalaanila neighborhood of Oulu killed ten people. The accident happened past midnight, at 12:54 AM. The blast shattered hundreds of windows in the city center, over two kilometers away, and hurled bricks and chunks of concrete several kilometers away. The blast was heard 45 km (28 mi) away, and registered by the seismographs at the Sodankylä geophysical observatory, over 270 km (170 mi) away. The cause of the explosion was the ignition of ammonium nitrate used as raw material for fertilizer and explosives. |
| Australia | Taroom, Queensland | 30 August 1972 | 3 | 12 | In the 1972 Taroom explosion, a truck carrying 12 tons of ammonium nitrate experienced an electrical fault and caught fire north of Taroom, Queensland. After the driver stopped and parked the burning truck, two brothers from a nearby cattle property who saw the fire rode up on motorbikes to assist. The three men were killed when the truck exploded at around 18:15. The explosion burnt out more than 800 hectares (2,000 acres) of surrounding bushland, and left a deep crater where the truck had been parked. A memorial to the three men was unveiled at the accident site in 2013. |
| United States | Kansas City, Missouri | 29 November 1988 | 6 | 23 (ANFO) | 1988 Kansas City explosion: On 29 November 1988, at 4:07 AM two trailers containing approximately 23,000 kg (50,000 lb) of the explosive ANFO (ammonium nitrate with fuel oil) exploded at a construction site located near the 87th street exit of Highway 71 in Kansas City, Missouri. The explosives were to be used in the blasting of rock while constructing Highway 71. The result of the explosions were the deaths of six firemen from the Kansas City Fire Department's Pumper Companies 30 and 41. A second blast occurred 40 minutes later, although all fire crews had been pulled back at this time. The blasts created two craters, each approximately 30 metres (100 ft) wide and 2.4 metres (8 ft) deep. The explosions also shattered windows within a 16-kilometre (10 mi) area and could be heard 64 kilometres (40 mi) away. It was later determined that the explosions were acts of arson, set by individuals embroiled in a labor dispute with the construction company contracted to build the highway. |
| Papua New Guinea | Porgera Gold Mine | 2 August 1994 | 11 | 80 (ANE) | At 9:45 am, 2 August 1994, 11 workers were killed when the sensitised AN emulsion plant they were working on exploded at the Porgera Gold Mine. The fatal explosion involved at most a few tonnes of explosive. A larger explosion of about 80 tonnes of ammonium nitrate emulsion, ANE, an emulsion of ammonium nitrate, fuel and water, UN 3375) was caused by fires under storage facilities at the site at 11:02 AM. There were no fatalities in the second explosion because the site had been evacuated. A mushroom cloud was seen to rise. |
| United States | Port Neal, Iowa | 13 December 1994 | 4 | | Port Neal fertilizer plant explosion: At about 6:06 AM on 13 December 1994, two explosions rocked the Port Neal, Iowa, ammonium nitrate processing plant operated by Terra Industries. Four people were killed and 18 injured. Approximately 5,700 tons of anhydrous ammonia were released and releases of ammonia continued for six days after the explosions. Groundwater under the processing plant was contaminated by chemicals released as a result of the blast. The timing of the explosion occurred prior to the start of the arrival of the 8:00 AM shift personnel, or the death toll might have been larger. |
| United States | Oklahoma City, Oklahoma | 19 April 1995 | 168–169 (+1) | 2.4 | Oklahoma City bombing: At 9:02 on 19 April 1995, a truck filled with 2.4 tons of ammonium nitrate exploded in front of the Alfred P. Murrah Federal Building in an anti-government terrorist attack. |
| China | Xingping, Shaanxi | 6 January 1998 | 22 | 27.6 | At 23:03 on 6 January 1998, the Xinghua Fertilizer company had a series of explosions in the plant. About 27.6 tons of ammonium nitrate liquor was in a container there. The explosion claimed 22 lives, with a further 56 wounded. The explosion was officially announced as an accident. |
| China | Shijiazhuang, Hebei | 16 March 2001 | 108 | | 2001 Shijiazhuang bombings: A man motivated by hatred of his ex-wife and her family detonated ammonium nitrate bombs at four locations across Shijiazhuang, killing 108 people and injuring 38 others. |
| China | Yan'an, Shaanxi | 16 July 2001 | 89+ | 30+ | Mafang Village explosion: On 16 July 2001, an embittered villager ignited ammonium nitrate explosives in a rival's warehouse. The explosion leveled much of the village and killed at least 89 people, and injured 98 others. |
| France | Toulouse | 21 September 2001 | 31 | 200–300 | AZF: On 21 September 2001, at 10:15 AM, in the AZF (Azote de France) fertiliser factory in Toulouse, France, an explosion occurred in a warehouse where the off-specification granular AN was stored flat, separated by partitions. About 200–300 tonnes were said to be involved in the explosion, resulting in 31 people dead and 2,442 injured, 34 of them seriously. The blast wave shattered windows up to 3 km (1.9 mi) away, and the resulting crater was 7 m deep and 60 m wide. The exact cause remains unknown. The material damage was estimated at 2.3 billion euros. France's Environment Minister initially suggested the explosion "may have been a terrorist attack" as it occurred soon after the 11 September attacks and one deceased worker may have had militant views. |
| Spain | Cartagena, Murcia | January 2003 | 0 | | The NPK fertilizer storage facility of Fertiberia held a self-sustained decomposition (SSD) fire in January 2003. The fire was controlled after most of the material was removed by mechanical means. |
| France | Saint-Romain-en-Jarez | 2 October 2003 | 0 | 3–5 | A fire broke out in Saint-Romain-en-Jarez (Loire) in a barn, which at the time of the accident contained a gasoline-powered forklift, a battery charger, two 13-kg gas bottles, miscellaneous farm machinery, 500 kg of quicklime, 500 wooden crates, 6,000 to 7,000 plastic crates, and between 3 and 5 tonnes of ammonium nitrate packaged in big bags. Bales of hay and straw were being stored on the mezzanine and ≈500 kg apples kept in the cold storage rooms. The fire started around 3 PM, and fire-fighters were notified of the blaze at 4:02 PM. They arrived on the scene at 4:23 and started to extinguish the fire. At 5:12 PM the explosion occurred. Twenty-six people were injured from the blast, most of them fire-fighters. |
| Spain | Barracas | 9 March 2004 | 2 | 25 | A truck carrying 25 tonnes of ammonium nitrate fertilizer exploded half an hour after a traffic accident on 9 March 2004, at 12:45, killing two people and injuring five others. The explosion, which could be heard at a distance of several kilometers caused a crater five metres deep. |
| Romania | Mihăileşti, Buzău | 24 May 2004 | 18 | 20 | Mihăileşti explosion: A truck carrying 20 tonnes of ammonium nitrate tipped over on the European road E85 near Mihăileşti at 4:57 AM on 24 May 2004. Shortly afterwards, a fire started in the cabin. Two reporters got to the site of the accident and started filming while firemen were trying to stop the fire. Around 5:50 AM the truck exploded, killing 18 and wounding 13 people. A crater 6.5 meters deep and 42 meters in diameter was formed by the explosion. |
| North Korea | Ryongchŏn | 22 April 2004 | 162 | | Ryongchon disaster: A freight train carrying ammonium nitrate exploded in this important railway town near the Chinese border on 22 April 2004, at around 13:00, killing 162 people and injuring over 3,000 others. The train station was destroyed, as were most buildings within 500 metres, and nearly 8,000 homes were destroyed or damaged. Two craters of about ten metres in depth were seen at the site of the explosion. The authorities blamed "human error" for the explosion, although rumours persist that it was in fact an attempt to assassinate the North Korean leader Kim Jong-il, who was due to be passing through the station at the time. |
| Spain | Estaca de Bares | 2007 | 0 | 400 | The NPK fertilizer cargo of the ship Ostedijk sustained a self-sustained decomposition (SSD) fire for 11 days. The ship carried a total of 6012 tonnes of NPK. Cargo hold 2, where the decomposition occurred, contained 2627 tonnes of fertilizer. NPK fertilizer contains about 15% ammonium nitrate. The fire plume reached 10 m in diameter and several hundred meters in length. Special water spears were inserted inside the cargo to extinguish the fire. |
| Mexico | Monclova, Coahuila | 9 September 2007 | 28 | 22 (ANFO) | On 9 September 2007, at around 20:00, near Monclova, Coahuila, México, a pickup truck lost control and crashed into a trailer loaded with 22 tons of ammonium nitrate and fuel oil explosives (ANFO) leaving three occupants in the pick-up truck dead in the crash. A fire then started in the trailer's cabin and at around 20:43, a huge explosion occurred, resulting in 28 deaths and around 150 more people injured. A crater 9 m (30 ft) wide and 1.8 m (6 ft) deep was created due to the explosion. |
| United States | Bryan, Texas | 30 July 2009 | 0 | | A plant in Bryan, Texas (El Dorado Chemical Company), which processes ammonium nitrate into fertilizer, caught fire at about 11:40 AM on 30 July 2009. Over 80,000 residents in the Bryan/College Station area were asked to evacuate south of town due to the toxic fumes this fire generated. Texas A&M University provided shelter at Reed Arena, a local venue on campus. Only minor injuries were reported. |
| Norway | Oslo, Norway | 22 July 2011 | 8 | 0.95 | 2011 Norway attacks: A government building was bombed with a truck carrying ammonium nitrate by terrorist Anders Behring Breivik, killing 8 people and injuring 210+ people before opening fire at a summer camp at Utøya, killing 67 and injuring 32 before being arrested. In all 77 people were killed, including two indirectly, and 320 people were injured all together in the attacks. |
| United States | West, Texas | 17 April 2013 | 15 | 240 | West Fertilizer Company explosion: A fertilizer company in West, Texas, caught fire. At around 19:50, ammonium nitrate stored there exploded, leveling roughly 80 homes and a middle school. 133 residents of a nearby nursing home were trapped in the ruins. In all, 15 were killed, and about 200 injured. There were reports that the facility had stored more ammonium nitrate than it was allowed to, without regulation by the Department of Homeland Security. |
| Australia | Wyandra, Queensland | 5 September 2014 | 0 | 56 | A truck carrying 56 tonnes rolled on a rural road, exploding shortly after the driver was rescued. There were two explosions, at 22:11 and 22:12, and they were heard 30 km (19 mi) away with debris being thrown 2 km (1.2 mi), it totally destroyed a highway bridge. The driver and six firemen were injured. |
| China | Port of Tianjin | 12 August 2015 | 173 | 800 | 2015 Tianjin explosions: Nitrocellulose stored at a hazardous goods warehouse spontaneously combusted after becoming overly hot and dry, resulting in a fire that 40 minutes later, at around 23:30, triggered the detonation of about 800 tonnes of ammonium nitrate stored nearby. 110 emergency personnel and 55 residents and employees were killed, while eight are missing. 798 people were injured. There was extensive damage to structures and goods at the port, damage to surrounding apartment blocks, and severe damage to a railway station. On 15 August 2015, there were again 8 consecutive explosions, at around 23:40. |
| Lebanon | Beirut | 4 August 2020 | 218 | 2,750 | 2020 Beirut explosion: On 4 August, a major fire broke out in a Port of Beirut warehouse and spread to 2,750 tonnes of ammonium nitrate which had been impounded and stored for six years after it was seized from an abandoned ship in 2014. The explosion happened at 18:10, causing immense damage throughout the entire city from the shock wave that was reportedly so intense it was felt in Cyprus, an island about 250 kilometres (160 mi) north-west of Lebanon. A giant orange cloud was seen following the detonation. As of 20 August 2020, there are at least 6500 confirmed injuries and over 200 confirmed deaths. According to Beirut's city governor, up to 300,000 people have lost their homes. The yield of the explosion in terms of TNT equivalent mass was estimated to be 0.5 kilotons as a "best estimate" and 1.12 kilotons as a "reasonable upper bound estimate", a study from the Blast and Impact Research Group at the University of Sheffield shows. |
| United States | Winston-Salem, North Carolina | 31 January 2022 | 0 | 600 | A fire which began 31 January 2022 destroyed the Winston Weaver Company fertilizer plant in Winston-Salem, North Carolina. An hour after firefighters arrived it was determined a railroad car near the building contained 82 tonnes of ammonium nitrate, and after studying the West Fertilizer Company explosion, those in charge learned from plant officials that more than 600 tonnes of ammonium nitrate were stored in the plant. Firefighters were evacuated and for a one-point-six-kilometre (1 mi) radius around the plant, residents were asked to leave because city fire chief Trey Mayo feared "one of the worst explosions in U.S. history". Residents were able to return home 3 February, though a mandatory evacuation was considered. By 7 February, investigators could enter the plant. |
| Australia | Bororen, Queensland | 30 August 2024 | 1 | 41.5 | 2024 Bruce Highway explosion: A utility vehicle crashed head-on with a truck transporting 41.5 tonnes of ammonium nitrate near Bororen, Queensland killing the driver of the utility vehicle and seriously injuring the truck driver. The crash caused the tanker to leak ammonium nitrate onto the Bruce Highway which caught fire shortly after. First responders noted that the leaked chemicals were on fire and ordered an evacuation of every person in a 2.5 kilometer radius of the crash. First responders made the decision to not extinguish the fire because of the inherent risk. The ammonium nitrate exploded almost 5 hours later. |
| India | Nowgam, Anantnag, Jammu and Kashmir | 5 November 2025 | 9 | | |

== See also ==
- ANFO (Ammonium Nitrate Fuel Oil)
- Largest artificial non-nuclear explosions, many of which involved ammonium nitrate
