= Grande Paroisse =

Grande Paroisse was a chemical company in France, with fertilizers as its main products. It was established in 1919 as a subsidiary of Air Liquide and Saint-Gobain. It took its name from La Grande-Paroisse, a commune near Montereau-Fault-Yonne in Seine-et-Marne, where its first factories were built. After having been part of Total and of Borealis, it was acquired by Agrofert in 2023. As of 2026, it is part of the LAT Nitrogen subsidiary of Agrofert, with production locations in Le Grand-Quevilly, Grandpuits, Ottmarsheim and Linz (Austria).

In 2001 the AZF factory in Toulouse, belonging to the Grande Paroisse group, exploded, leaving 31 dead.
