= AZF (factory) =

Former chemical factory in Toulouse, France

Coordinates: 43.567°N 1.427°E

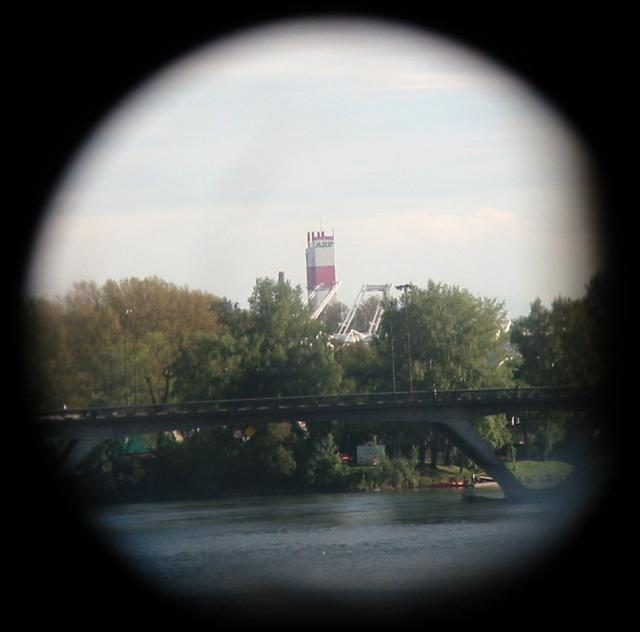
AZF from city center, 4 or 5 km (through tourist public telescope)

AZF (French pronunciation: [a.zɛ.d‿ɛf]; French initialism for AZote Fertilisant; French pronunciation: [azɔt fɛʁtilizɑ̃], i.e. nitrogen fertilizer) was the name of a chemical factory in Toulouse, France, which exploded on 21 September 2001. The blast was equivalent to 20-40 tons of TNT, producing an earthquake with a magnitude of 3.4, and was heard 80 km (50 miles) away. The incident resulted in 31 deaths and left 2,500 wounded. Damages paid by insurance companies exceeded 1.5 billion euros.

Although authorities initially treated the incident as an accident, the then Environment Minister speculated that the explosion may have been "a terrorist attack" in the wake of the September 11 attacks. The body of a worker known to harbor Islamic fundamentalist sympathies was found in the blast and investigated, although official investigation found the blast to be accidental. In spring of 2004, a terrorist group adopted the same name and threatened the French government with bombings.

== Toulouse chemical factory explosion ==
On 21 September 2001, an explosion occurred in the AZF fertiliser factory in Toulouse, France, belonging to the Grande Paroisse branch of the Total group.

Three hundred tonnes of ammonium nitrate were stored in hangar #221 (the maximum capacity was 2,000 tonnes). The whole factory was destroyed, leaving a crater with a depth of about 7 m (23 ft) and a diameter of 40 m (131 ft); steel girders were found 3 km away from the explosion. The blast measured 3.4 on the Richter scale, with an estimated power equivalent to 20-40 tons of TNT. The explosion was heard 80 km (50 miles) away. Due to the acoustics of the hills and the loud sound, the explosion was reported as occurring in multiple places. Police at first believed that at least five bombs had simultaneously gone off. There is still controversy over the exact number of explosions.

The factory was close to the city: one of the most inhabited areas, Le Mirail, is just 1 kilometre (0.62 mi) away. Several schools, a university campus, a hospital and a psychiatric hospital had to be evacuated.

=== Victims ===
The disaster caused 31 deaths (30 from the factory, and 1 pupil from a neighbouring secondary school), about 30 seriously wounded, and 2,500 light casualties. Two thirds of the city's windows were shattered, causing 70 eye wounds. The complete environmental consequences of the catastrophe are not yet fully known. The total damages paid by insurance groups currently exceed 1.5 billion euros.

== Investigation ==
On 4 October 2001, France's then Environment Minister Yves Cochet announced that the explosion "may have been a terrorist attack" (the explosion occurred in the weeks following the September 11 attacks) and identified Hassan Jandoubi, a plant sub-contractor killed in the blast, as a person under investigation. French anti-terrorist authorities were prohibited by the Toulouse prosecutor from searching Jandoubi's house for five days after the incident.

Police declared that Jandoubi had "possible Islamic fundamentalist sympathies", yet by the time the search was finally conducted, they alleged that Jandoubi's girlfriend had disposed of all traces of his clothes or photos. French authorities described the delay as damaging to the investigation.

== See also ==
- Ammonium nitrate disasters
