= Azidophenylalanine =

Names
- IUPAC name (2S)-2-Amino-3-(4-azidophenyl)propanoic acid
- Other names: 4-Azidophenylalanine; 4-Azido-L-phenylalanine; p-Azido-L-phenylalanine; AzF; 4AZP

Identifiers
CAS Number	33173-53-4
3D model (JSmol)	Interactive image
ChEBI	CHEBI:228211
ChemSpider	2338505
EC Number	810-082-7
PubChem CID	3080772
CompTox Dashboard (EPA)	DTXSID10186829
- InChI: InChI=1S/C9H10N4O2/c10-8(9(14)15)5-6-1-3-7(4-2-6)12-13-11/h1-4,8H,5,10H2,(H,14,15)/t8-/m0/s1 Key: NEMHIKRLROONTL-QMMMGPOBSA-N
- SMILES: C1=CC(=CC=C1C[C@@H](C(=O)O)N)N=[N+]=[N-]

Properties
Chemical formula	C_{9}H_{10}N_{4}O_{2}
Molar mass	206.205 g·mol^{−1}
Appearance	Off-white solid

Hazards
- GHS labelling
Pictograms	(GHS07: Exclamation mark)
Signal word	Warning
Hazard statements	H315, H319
Precautionary statements	P264, P264+P265, P270, P280, P301+P317, P302+P352, P305+P351+P338, P321, P330, P332+P317, P337+P317, P362+P364, P501
- Except where otherwise noted, data are given for materials in their standard state (at 25 °C [77 °F], 100 kPa). Infobox references

Azidophenylalanine (4-azido-L-phenylalanine) is an unnatural amino acid derivative of L-phenylalanine, featuring an azide group at the para position of the phenyl ring. It is a bioorthogonal click-chemistry reagent that can be genetically incorporated into proteins via expanded genetic code techniques for site-specific labeling and functionalization. The compound serves as a vibrational reporter for local protein environments due to its azide group and is used in photo-crosslinking for protein interaction studies.

== Chemical properties ==
Azidophenylalanine has the molecular formula C_{9}H_{10}N_{4}O_{2} and a molecular weight of 206.20 g/mol. Its IUPAC name is (2S)-2-amino-3-(4-azidophenyl)propanoic acid. It appears as an off-white solid and is soluble in water, DMSO, and DMF.

As with many other azides, the isolated compound exhibits explosive properties. It is light-sensitive and should be stored at -20 °C in the dark.

== Synthesis ==
A chromatography-free synthesis of azidophenylalanine has been reported. It starts from L-phenylalanine and includes iodination to form 4-iodo-L-phenylalanine, followed by Boc protection, Cu(I)-catalyzed azidation using sodium azide (NaN_{3}), deprotection with sulfuric acid, and purification by recrystallization. This method avoids explosion risks associated with earlier approaches.

== Research uses ==
As an analog of L-phenylalanine, azidophenylalanine is incorporated into proteins during translation in place of phenylalanine. The azide group enables bioorthogonal reactions, such as copper-catalyzed or strain-promoted azide-alkyne cycloadditions, for protein modification.

Azidophenylalanine is employed in metabolic labeling to detect nascent protein synthesis as a non-radioactive alternative to traditional methods. It facilitates site-specific protein labeling for microscopic imaging, purification, and FRET studies. Applications include photochemical control of fluorescent proteins, synthesis of ligands for metal complexation in EPR/NMR, and probing protein dynamics during folding or catalysis. It is incorporated using orthogonal tRNA/synthetase pairs in systems like E. coli.
