= Oppau explosion =

1921 industrial disaster in present-day Ludwigshafen, Germany

Coordinates: 49°31′04″N 8°25′06″E

Postcard 1 Oppau Explosion Crater

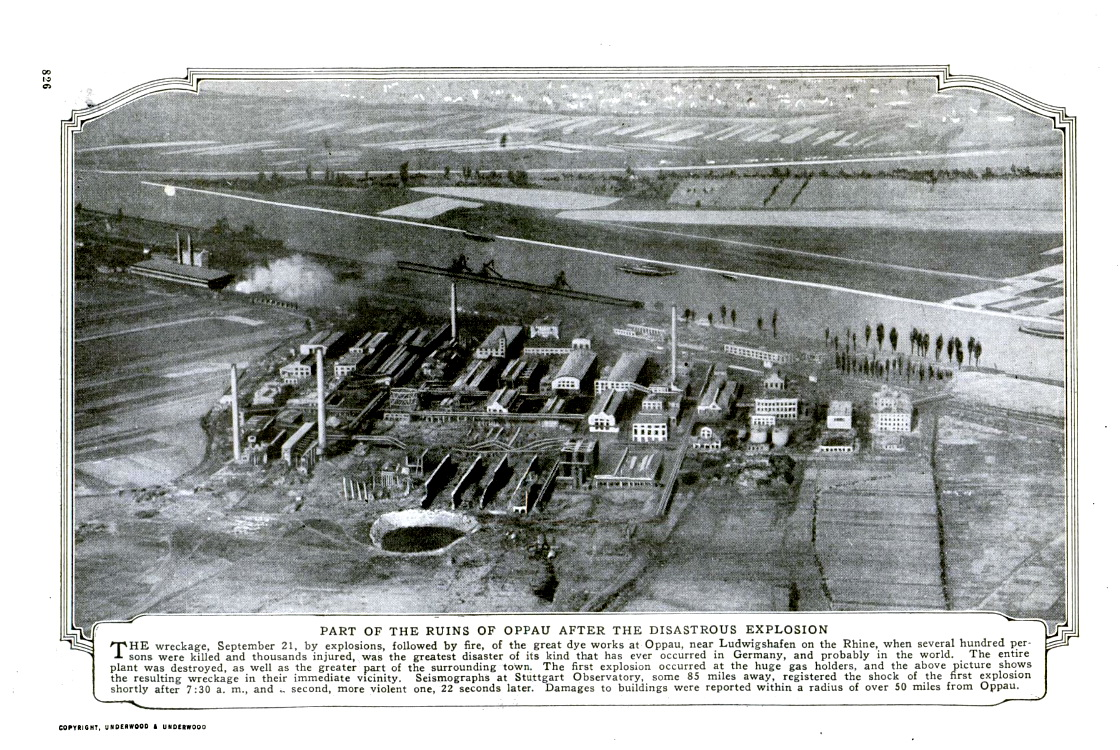
Aerial photograph from Popular Mechanics magazine, 1921

The Oppau explosion occurred on September 21, 1921, when approximately 4,500 tonnes of a mixture of ammonium sulfate and ammonium nitrate fertilizer stored in a tower silo exploded at a BASF plant in Oppau, now part of Ludwigshafen, Germany, killing at least 560 people and injuring about 2,000 more.

== Background ==
The plant began producing ammonium sulfate in 1911, but during World War I when Germany was unable to obtain the necessary sulfur, it began to produce ammonium nitrate as well. Ammonia could be produced without overseas resources, using the Haber process, and the plant was the first of its kind to do so in the world.

Compared to ammonium sulfate, ammonium nitrate is strongly hygroscopic, thus the mixture of ammonium sulfate and nitrate compresses under its own weight, turning it into a plaster-like substance in the 20-metre-high (66 ft) silo. The workers needed to use pickaxes to get it out, a problematic situation because they could not enter the silo and risk being buried in collapsing fertilizer. To ease their work, small charges of dynamite were used to loosen the mixture.

This highly dangerous procedure was in fact common practice. It was well known that ammonium nitrate was explosive, having been used extensively for this purpose during World War I, but tests conducted in 1919 had suggested that mixtures of ammonium sulfate and nitrate containing less than 60% nitrate would not explode. On these grounds, the material handled by the plant, nominally a 50/50 mixture, was considered stable enough to be stored in 50,000-tonne lots, more than ten times the amount involved in the disaster. Indeed, nothing extraordinary had happened during an estimated 20,000 firings, until the fateful explosion on September 21.

As all involved died in the explosion, the causes are not clear. However, according to modern sources and contrary to the above-mentioned 1919 tests, the "less than 60% nitrate = safe" criterion is inaccurate; in mixtures containing 50% nitrate, any explosion of the mixture is confined to a small volume around the initiating charge, but increasing the proportion of nitrate to 55–60% greatly increases the explosive properties and creates a mixture whose detonation is sufficiently powerful to initiate detonation in a surrounding mixture of a lower nitrate concentration which would normally be considered minimally explosive. Changes in humidity, density, particle size in the mixture and homogeneity of crystal structure also affect the explosive properties.

A few months before the incident, the manufacturing process had been changed in such a way as to lower the humidity level of the mixture from 3–4% to 2%, and also to lower the apparent density. Both these factors rendered the substance more likely to explode. There is also evidence that the lot in question was not of uniform composition and contained pockets of up to several dozen metric tons of mixture enriched in ammonium nitrate. It has therefore been proposed that one of the charges had been placed in or near such a pocket, exploding with sufficient violence to set off some of the surrounding lower-nitrate mixture.

Two months earlier, at Kriewald, then part of Germany, 19 people had died when 30 metric tons of ammonium nitrate detonated under similar circumstances. It is not clear why this warning was not heeded.

== Scale of the explosion ==
Two explosions, half a second apart, occurred at 7:32 am on September 21, 1921, at Silo 110 of the plant, forming a crater 90 by 125 m (300 by 410 ft) wide and 19 m (62 ft) deep. In these explosions 10% of the 4,500 t of fertilizer stored in the silo detonated. The explosions were heard as two loud bangs in north-eastern France and in Munich, more than 300 km away, and are estimated to have contained an energy of 1–2 kilotonnes TNT equivalent.

The damage to property was valued in 1922 at 321 million marks, estimated by The New York Times at the time to be equivalent to 1.7 million US dollars (since Germany suffered heavy hyperinflation in 1919–1924, given amounts and exchange rates were not very descriptive). About 80 percent of all buildings in Oppau were destroyed, leaving 6,500 homeless. The pressure wave caused great damage in Mannheim, located just across the Rhine, ripped roofs off up to 25 km away, and destroyed windows farther away, including all the medieval stained-glass windows of Worms cathedral, 15 km (9.3 mi) to the north. In Heidelberg (30 km (19 mi) from Oppau), traffic was stopped by the mass of broken glass on the streets, a tram was derailed, and some roofs were destroyed.

Five hundred bodies were recovered within the first 48 hours, with the final death toll recorded being in excess of 560 people. The funeral was attended by German President Friedrich Ebert and Prime Minister Hugo Lerchenfeld, and saw crowds of 70,000 people at the cemetery in Ludwigshafen.

== See also ==
- Ammonium nitrate disasters
- Largest artificial non-nuclear explosions
