= Ammonium nitrate =

Chemical compound with formula NH4NO3

- Structural formula of ammonium cation (left) and nitrate anion (right)

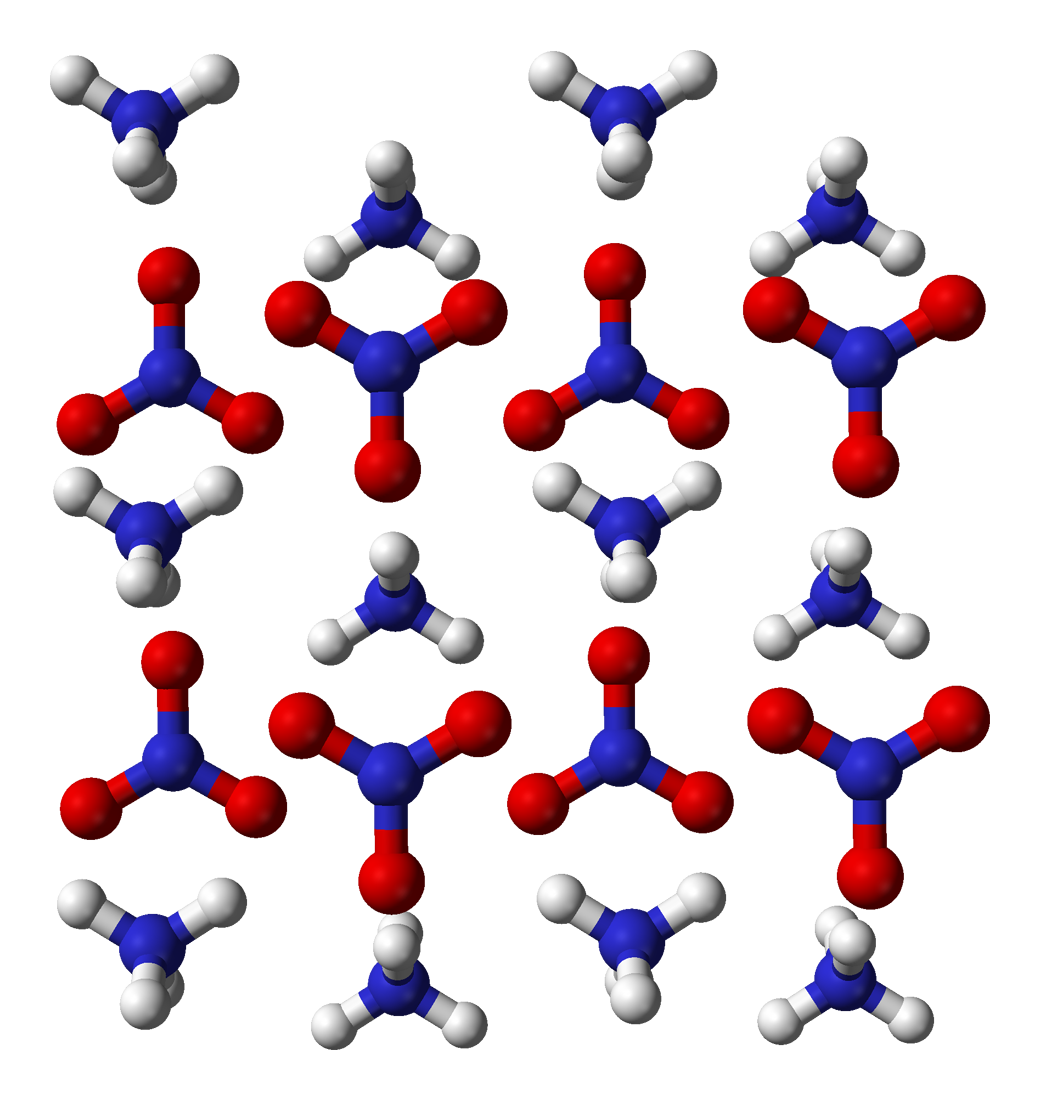
- H=white, N=blue, O=red

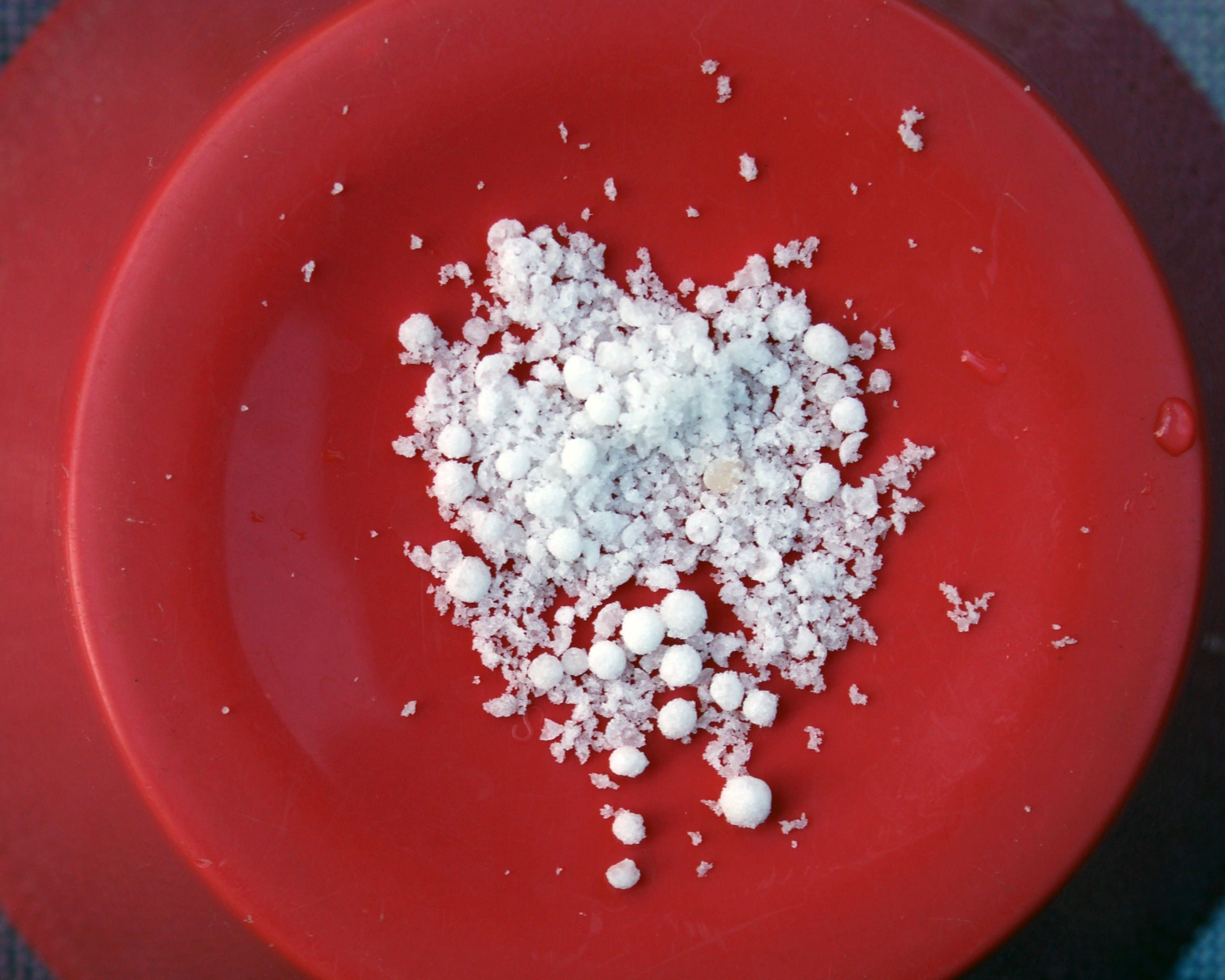

Names
- IUPAC name Ammonium nitrate

Identifiers
CAS Number	6484-52-2
3D model (JSmol)	Interactive image
ChEBI	CHEBI:63038
ChEMBL	ChEMBL1500032
ChemSpider	21511
ECHA InfoCard	100.026.680
EC Number	229-347-8
PubChem CID	22985
RTECS number	BR9050000
UNII	T8YA51M7Y6
UN number	0222 – with > 0.2% combustible substances 1942 – with ≤ 0.2% combustible substances 2067 – fertilizers 2426 – liquid
CompTox Dashboard (EPA)	DTXSID2029668
- InChI: InChI=1S/NO3.H3N/c2-1(3)4;/h;1H3/q-1;/p+1 Key: DVARTQFDIMZBAA-UHFFFAOYSA-O; InChI=1/NO3.H3N/c2-1(3)4;/h;1H3/q-1;/p+1 Key: DVARTQFDIMZBAA-IKLDFBCSAH
- SMILES: [O-][N+]([O-])=O.[NH4+]

Properties
Chemical formula	NH_{4}NO_{3}
Molar mass	80.043 g/mol
Appearance	white crystalline solid
Density	1.725 g/cm^{3} (20 °C)
Melting point	169.6 °C (337.3 °F; 442.8 K)
Boiling point	approx. 210 °C (410 °F; 483 K) decomposes
Solubility in water	Endothermic; 118 g/100 ml (0 °C); 150 g/100 ml (10 °C); 192 g/100 ml (20 °C); 297 g/100 ml (40 °C); 410 g/100 ml (60 °C); 576 g/100 ml (80 °C); 1024 g/100 ml (100 °C)
Magnetic susceptibility (χ)	−33.6×10^{−6} cm^{3}/mol

Structure
Crystal structure	orthorhombic

Explosive data
Shock sensitivity	very low
Friction sensitivity	very low
Detonation velocity	2500 m/s

Hazards
- Occupational safety and health (OHS/OSH)
Main hazards	Explosive, Oxidizer
- GHS labelling
Pictograms	(GHS07: Exclamation mark) (GHS03: Oxidizing) (GHS01: Explosive)
Signal word	Danger
Hazard statements	H201, H271, H319
Precautionary statements	P220, P221, P264, P271, P280, P372
NFPA 704 (fire diamond)	1 0 3 OX
- Lethal dose or concentration (LD, LC)
LD_{50} (median dose)	2085–5300 mg/kg (oral in rats, mice)

Related compounds
Other anions	Ammonium nitrite
Other cations	Sodium nitrate Potassium nitrate Hydroxylammonium nitrate
Related compounds	Ammonium perchlorate
- Except where otherwise noted, data are given for materials in their standard state (at 25 °C [77 °F], 100 kPa). verify (what is ?) Infobox references

Ammonium nitrate is a chemical compound with the formula NH_{4}NO_{3}. It is a white crystalline salt consisting of ions of ammonium and nitrate. It is highly soluble in water and hygroscopic as a solid, but does not form hydrates. It is predominantly used in agriculture as a high-nitrogen fertilizer.

Its other major use is as a component of explosive mixtures used in mining, quarrying, and civil construction. It is the major constituent of ANFO, an industrial explosive which accounts for 80% of explosives used in North America; similar formulations have been used in improvised explosive devices.

Many countries are phasing out its use in consumer applications due to concerns over its potential for misuse. Accidental ammonium nitrate explosions have killed thousands of people since the early 20th century. Global production was estimated at 21.6 million tonnes in 2017. By 2021, global production of ammonium nitrate was down to 16.7 million tonnes.

== Occurrence ==
Ammonium nitrate is found as the natural mineral gwihabaite (formerly known as nitrammite) – the ammonium analogue of saltpetre (mineralogical name: niter) – in the driest regions of the Atacama Desert in Chile, often as a crust on the ground or in conjunction with other nitrate, iodate, and halide minerals. Ammonium nitrate was mined there until the Haber–Bosch process made it possible to synthesize nitrates from atmospheric nitrogen, rendering nitrate mining obsolete.

== Production, reactions and crystalline phases ==
The industrial production of ammonium nitrate entails the acid-base reaction of ammonia with nitric acid:

HNO_{3} + NH_{3} → NH_{4}NO_{3}

The ammonia required for this process is obtained by the Haber process from nitrogen and hydrogen. Ammonia produced by the Haber process can be oxidized to nitric acid by the Ostwald process. Ammonia is used in its anhydrous form (a gas) and the nitric acid is concentrated. The reaction is violent owing to its highly exothermic nature. After the solution is formed, typically at about 83% concentration, the excess water is evaporated off to leave an ammonium nitrate (AN) content of 95% to 99.9% concentration (AN melt), depending on grade. The AN melt is then made into "prills" or small beads in a spray tower, or into granules by spraying and tumbling in a rotating drum. The prills or granules may be further dried, cooled, and then coated to prevent caking. These prills or granules are the typical AN products in commerce.

Another production method is a variant of the nitrophosphate process:

Ca(NO_{3})_{2} + 2 NH_{3} + CO_{2} + H_{2}O → 2 NH_{4}NO_{3} + CaCO_{3}

The products, calcium carbonate and ammonium nitrate, may be separately purified or sold combined as calcium ammonium nitrate.

Ammonium nitrate can also be made via metathesis reactions:

(NH_{4})_{2}SO_{4} + Ba(NO_{3})_{2} → 2 NH_{4}NO_{3} + BaSO_{4}
(NH_{4})_{2}SO_{4} + Ca(NO_{3})_{2} → 2 NH_{4}NO_{3} + CaSO_{4}
NH_{4}Cl + AgNO_{3} → NH_{4}NO_{3} + AgCl

=== Reactions ===
As ammonium nitrate is a salt, both the cation, NH^{+}_{4}, and the anion, NO^{−}_{3}, may take part in chemical reactions.

Solid ammonium nitrate decomposes on heating. At temperatures below around 300 °C, the decomposition mainly produces nitrous oxide and water:

NH_{4}NO_{3} → N_{2}O + 2 H_{2}O

At higher temperatures, the following reaction predominates.

2 NH_{4}NO_{3} → 2 N_{2} + O_{2} + 4 H_{2}O

Both decomposition reactions are exothermic and their products are gases. Under certain conditions, this can lead to a runaway reaction, with the decomposition process becoming explosive. See § Disasters for details. Many ammonium nitrate disasters, with loss of lives, have occurred.

The red–orange colour in an explosion cloud is due to nitrogen dioxide, a secondary reaction product.

=== Crystalline phases ===
Several crystalline phases of ammonium nitrate have been observed. The following occur under atmospheric pressure.

Phase	Temperature (°C)	Symmetry
(liquid)	(above 169.6)	
I	169.6 to 125.2	cubic
II	125.2 to 84.2	tetragonal
III	84.2 to 32.3	α-rhombic
IV	32.3 to −16.8	β-rhombic
V	below −16.8	tetragonal

The transition between β-rhombic to α-rhombic forms (at 32.3 °C) occurs at ambient temperature in many parts of the world. These forms have a 3.6% difference in density and hence transition between them causes a change in volume. One practical consequence of this is that ammonium nitrate cannot be used as a solid rocket motor propellant, as it develops cracks. Stabilized ammonium nitrate (PSAN) was developed as a solution to this and incorporates metal halides stabilisers, which prevent density fluctuations.

== Applications ==
=== Fertilizer ===
Ammonium nitrate is an important fertilizer with NPK rating 34-0-0 (34% nitrogen). Whilst less concentrated than urea (46-0-0), ammonium nitrate is more stable and does not rapidly lose nitrogen to the atmosphere.

=== Explosives ===
Ammonium nitrate readily forms explosive mixtures with varying properties when combined with explosives such as TNT or with fuels like aluminium powder or fuel oil. Examples of explosives containing ammonium nitrate include:

- Amatex (ammonium nitrate, TNT and RDX)
- Amatol (ammonium nitrate and TNT)
- Ammonal (ammonium nitrate and aluminum powder)
- ANFO (ammonium nitrate and fuel oil)
- Astrolite (ammonium nitrate and hydrazine rocket fuel)
- Goma-2 (ammonium nitrate, nitroglycol, nitrocellulose, dibutyl phthalate and fuel)
- Minol (explosive) (ammonium nitrate, TNT and aluminum powder)
- Nitrolite (ammonium nitrate, TNT and nitroglycerin +)
- DBX (ammonium nitrate, RDX, TNT and aluminum powder)
- Tovex (ammonium nitrate and methylammonium nitrate)

==== Mixture with fuel oil ====
ANFO is a mixture of 94% ammonium nitrate ("AN") and 6% fuel oil ("FO") widely used as a bulk industrial explosive. It is used in coal mining, quarrying, metal mining, and civil construction in undemanding applications where the advantages of ANFO's low cost, relative safety, and ease of use matter more than the benefits offered by conventional industrial explosives, such as water resistance, oxygen balance, high detonation velocity, and performance in small diameters.

==== Terrorism ====
Ammonium nitrate-based explosives were used in the Sterling Hall bombing in Madison, Wisconsin, 1970, the Oklahoma City bombing in 1995, the 2011 Delhi bombings, the 2011 bombing in Oslo, the Myyrmanni bombing and the 2013 Hyderabad blasts.

In November 2009, the government of the KPK (previously termed as NWFP) of Pakistan imposed a ban on ammonium sulfate, ammonium nitrate, and calcium ammonium nitrate fertilizers in the former Malakand Division – comprising the Upper Dir, Lower Dir, Swat, Chitral, and Malakand districts of the NWFP – following reports that those chemicals were used by militants to make explosives. Due to these bans, "Potassium chlorate – the material which allows safety matches to catch fire – has surpassed fertilizer as the explosive of choice for insurgents."

=== Niche uses ===
Ammonium nitrate is used in some instant cold packs, as its dissolution in water is highly endothermic. In 2021, King Abdullah University of Science and Technology in Saudi Arabia conducted experiments to study the potential for dissolving ammonium nitrate in water for off-grid cooling systems and as a refrigerant. They suggested that the water could be distilled and reused using solar energy to avoid water wastage in severe environments.

It was once used, in combination with independently explosive "fuels" such as guanidine nitrate, as a cheaper (but less stable) alternative to 5-aminotetrazole in the inflators of airbags manufactured by Takata Corporation, which were recalled as unsafe after killing 14 people. The current USA death total is 27.

== Safety, handling, and storage ==
Numerous safety guidelines are available for storing and handling ammonium nitrate. Health and safety data are shown on the safety data sheets available from suppliers and from various governments.

Pure ammonium nitrate does not burn, but as a strong oxidizer, it supports and accelerates the combustion of organic (and some inorganic) material. It should not be stored near combustible substances.

While ammonium nitrate is stable at ambient temperature and pressure under many conditions, it may detonate from a strong initiation charge. It should not be stored near high explosives or blasting agents.

Molten ammonium nitrate is very sensitive to shock and detonation, particularly if it becomes contaminated with incompatible materials such as combustibles, flammable liquids, acids, chlorates, chlorides, sulfur, metals, charcoal and sawdust.

Contact with certain substances such as chlorates, mineral acids and metal sulfides, can lead to vigorous or even violent decomposition capable of igniting nearby combustible material or detonating.

Ammonium nitrate begins decomposition after melting, releasing NO_{x}, HNO_{3}, NH_{3} and H_{2}O. It should not be heated in a confined space. The resulting heat and pressure from decomposition increases the sensitivity to detonation and increases the speed of decomposition. Detonation may occur at 80 atmospheres. Contamination can reduce this to 20 atmospheres.

Ammonium nitrate has a critical relative humidity of 59.4% at 30 °C. At higher humidity it will absorb moisture from the atmosphere. Therefore, it is important to store ammonium nitrate in a tightly sealed container. Otherwise, it can coalesce into a large, solid mass. Ammonium nitrate can absorb enough moisture to liquefy. Blending ammonium nitrate with certain other fertilizers can lower the critical relative humidity.

The potential for use of the material as an explosive has prompted regulatory measures. For example, in Australia, the Dangerous Goods Regulations came into effect in August 2005 to enforce licensing in dealing with such substances. Licenses are granted only to applicants (industry) with appropriate security measures in place to prevent any misuse. Additional uses such as education and research purposes may also be considered, but individual use will not. Employees of those with licenses to deal with the substance are still required to be supervised by authorized personnel and are required to pass a security and national police check before a license may be granted.

== Health hazards ==
Ammonium nitrate is not hazardous to health and is usually used in fertilizer products.

Ammonium nitrate has an LD_{50} of 2217 mg/kg, which for comparison is about two-thirds that of table salt.

== Disasters ==
Ammonium nitrate decomposes, non-explosively, into the gases nitrous oxide and water vapor when heated. However, it can be induced to decompose explosively by detonation. Large stockpiles of the material can also be a major fire risk due to their supporting oxidation, a situation which can easily escalate to detonation. Explosions are not uncommon: relatively minor incidents occur most years, and several large and devastating explosions have also occurred. Examples include the Oppau explosion of 1921 (one of the largest artificial non-nuclear explosions), the Texas City disaster of 1947, the 2015 Tianjin explosions in China, and the 2020 Beirut explosion.

Ammonium nitrate can explode through two mechanisms:

- Shock induced detonation. An explosive charge within or in contact with a mass of ammonium nitrate causes the ammonium nitrate to detonate. Examples of such disasters are Kriewald, Morgan (present-day Sayreville, New Jersey), Oppau, and Tessenderlo.
- Deflagration to detonation transition. The ammonium nitrate explosion results from a fire that spreads into the ammonium nitrate (Texas City, TX; Brest; West, TX; Tianjin; Beirut), or from ammonium nitrate mixing with a combustible material during the fire (Gibbstown, Cherokee, Nadadores). The fire must be confined at least to a degree for successful transition from a fire to an explosion.

== See also ==
- Resource recovery
