= Hollo =

Hollo may refer to:

- Anselm Hollo (1934–2013), Finnish poet and translator
- Juho Aukusti Hollo (1885–1967), Finnish translator
- Tibor Hollo (born 1927), American real estate developer
- Hollo, Pennsylvania, an unincorporated community in the United States

== See also ==
- Iso-Hollo
