= CH6N2O3 =

The molecular formula CH_{6}N_{2}O_{3} (molar mass: 94.07 g/mol, exact mass: 94.0378 u) may refer to:

- Hydrogen peroxide - urea
- Methylammonium nitrate
