= MMAN =

MMAN may refer to:

- Monomethylamine nitrate
- Monomethylammonium nitrate
- the ICAO code for Del Norte International Airport
