= Robert Archambeau (writer) =

American writer

Robert Archambeau (born 1968) is a novelist, poet and critic. Son of Canadian ceramic artist, Robert Archambeau, Archambeau was born in Providence, Rhode Island and raised in Winnipeg, Manitoba. He teaches English as a professor at Lake Forest College near Chicago.

His scholarly work explores the social context of the history of poetics: he has been called "our smartest poetic sociologist" in the scholarly journal Contemporary Literature.

Archambeau's works include his debut novel, Alice B. Toklas is Missing as well as poetry collections: Citation Suite, The Kafka Sutra, and Home and Variations; and works of literary criticism: Laureates and Heretics, The Poet Resigns: Poetry in a Difficult World, and Inventions of a Barbarous Age: Poetry from Conceptualism to Rhyme.

He has also edited a number of works, including Word Play Place: Essays on the Poetry of John Matthias, The &NOW Awards: The Best Innovative Writing, and Letters of Blood: English Writings of Göran Printz-Påhlson. Along with John Matthias he is the co-author of Revolutions: A Collaboration, a collection of prose and poetry with images by the artist Jean Dibble.

In 2001, he ran an election on the POETICS list as a protest against the appointment of Billy Collins as Poet Laureate Consultant in Poetry to the Library of Congress. Anselm Hollo was elected to the honorary position.

Along with R.S. Gwynn he chaired the Poets' Prize committee.

In November of 2023, Regal House Publishing, released Archambeau's debut novel, Alice B. Toklas is Missing. He is currently at work on the sequel.

He has received grants and awards from the Academy of American Poets, the Illinois Arts Council, and the Swedish Academy. He is a poetry editor of The Fortnightly Review.

Slate magazine listed his book The Poet Resigns as one of the most underrated books of 2013.
