= Tokugawa =

Tokugawa (/ˌtɒkuːˈɡɑːwə/ TOK-oo-GAH-wə, Japanese: [to.kɯꜜ.ɡa.wa, -ŋa.wa]) may refer to:

- Tokugawa clan, a Japanese noble family
- Tokugawa era, a period of Japanese history (1603–1868)
- Tokugawa Ieyasu (1543–1616), founder of the Tokugawa shogunate
- Tokugawa shogunate, a Japanese feudal regime of Japan (1603–1868)
- Tokugawa (surname) (Shinjitai: 徳川; Kyūjitai: 德川), a Japanese surname
