= Water gel =

Water gel may refer to:

- Hydrogel, a soft water-rich polymer gel
- Water crystal gel, a water-absorbing polymer
- Water gel explosive, a fuel-sensitized explosive mixture
