= 德川 =

德川 or 徳川 may refer to:

- Tokchon, a city in North Korea
- Tokugawa clan, a Japanese noble family
- Tokugawa era, a period of Japanese history (1603–1868)
- Tokugawa Ieyasu (1543–1616), founder of the Tokugawa shogunate
- Tokugawa shogunate, a Japanese feudal regime of Japan (1603–1868)
- Tokugawa (surname) (Shinjitai: 徳川; Kyūjitai: 德川), a Japanese surname
