= ANFO =

Industrial high explosive

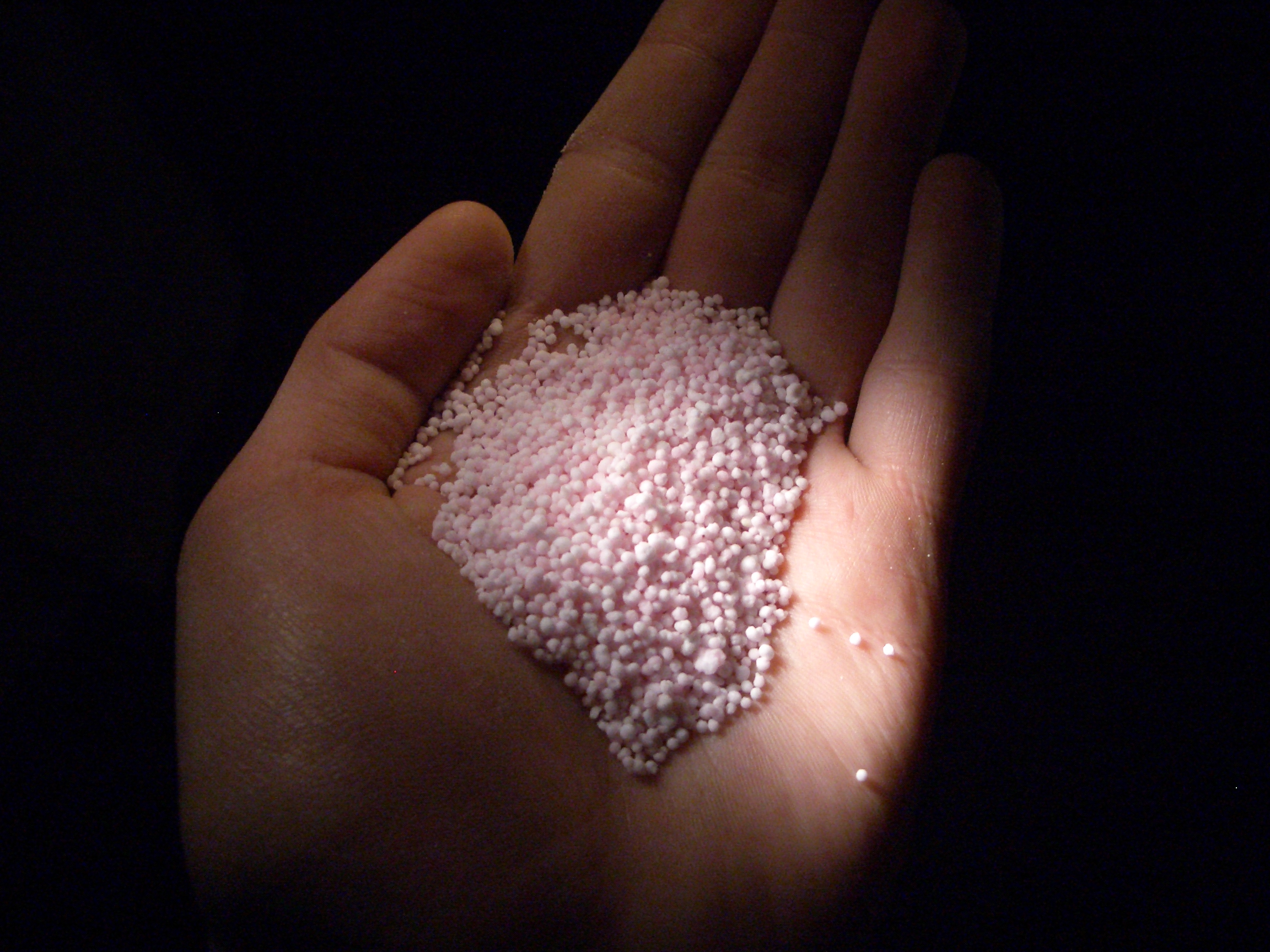
Ammonium nitrate prills used in ANFO at a potash mine.

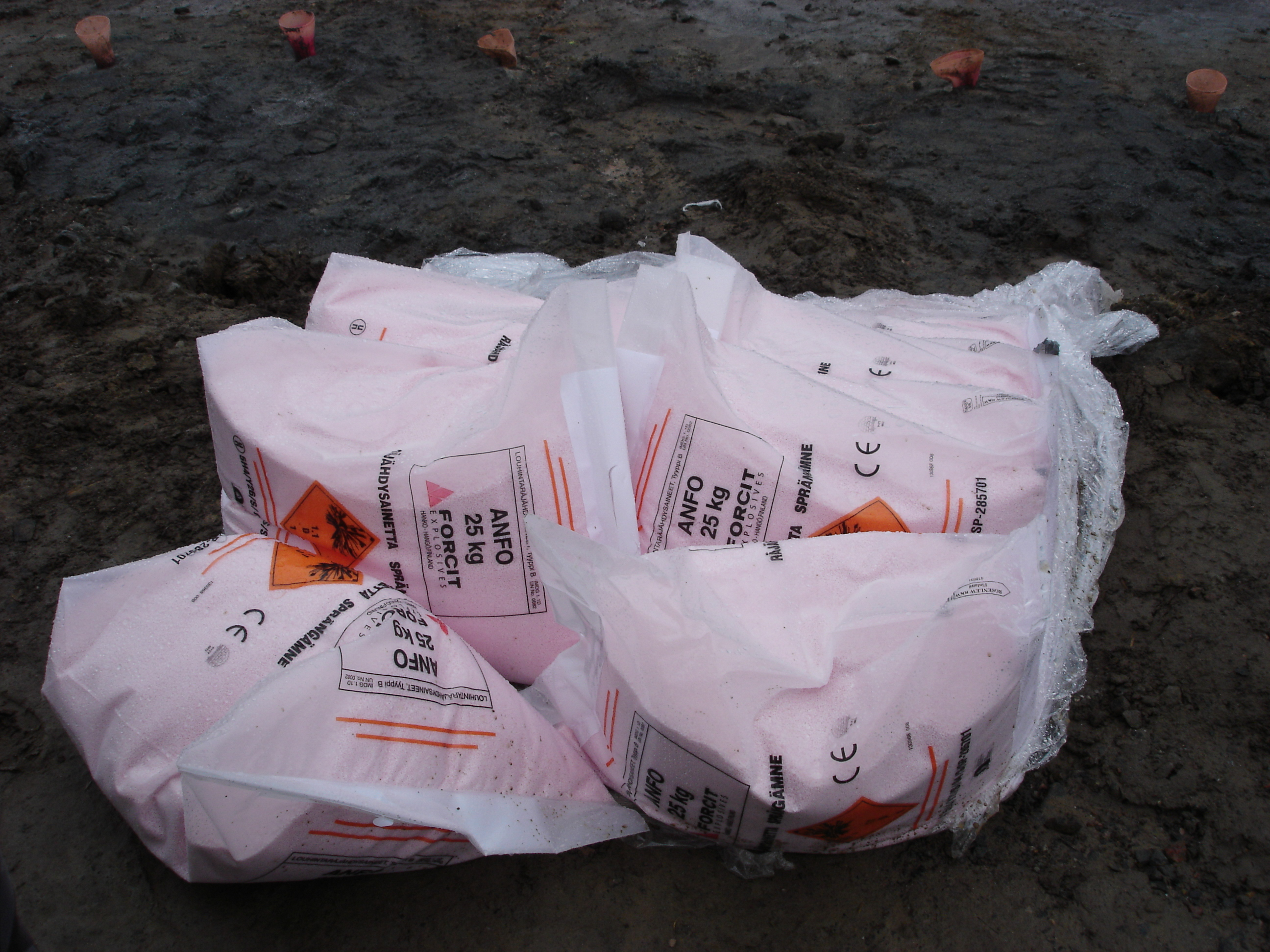
25 kg (55 lb) sacks containing ANFO

ANFO, also written as AN/FO (an acronym for ammonium nitrate/fuel oil; /ˈænfoʊ/ AN-foh) is a widely used bulk industrial high explosive. It consists of 94% porous prilled ammonium nitrate (NH_{4}NO_{3}) (AN), which acts as the oxidizing agent and absorbent for the fuel, and 6% number 2 fuel oil (FO) (road diesel).

The use of ANFO originated in the 1950s. It is highly insensitive as an explosive, requiring a quantity of secondary explosive, known as a primer or a booster (larger than a standard blasting cap), in order to be detonated.

It has found wide use in coal mining, quarrying, metal ore mining, and civil construction in applications where its low cost and ease of use may outweigh the benefits of other explosives, such as water resistance, oxygen balance, higher detonation velocity, or performance in small-diameter columns. The mining industry accounts for an estimated 90% of the more than 5.5 million pounds (2.5 thousand tonnes) of explosives used annually in the United States. ANFO is also widely used in avalanche control.

ANFO mixed with nitromethane as the fuel is known as ANNM.

== Chemistry ==
The chemistry of ANFO detonation is the reaction of ammonium nitrate with a long-chain alkane hydrocarbon (C_{n}H_{2n+2}) to form nitrogen, carbon dioxide, and steam. In an ideal stoichiometrically balanced reaction, ANFO is composed of about 94.5% AN and 5.5% FO by weight. In practice, a slight excess of fuel oil is added, as underdosing results in reduced performance while overdosing merely results in more post-blast fumes. When detonation conditions are optimal, the gases are the only products. In practical use, such conditions are impossible to attain, and blasts produce moderate amounts of toxic gases such as carbon monoxide and nitrogen oxides (NO_{x}).

The fuel component of ANFO is typically diesel fuel, but kerosene, coal dust, racing fuels like nitromethane, or even molasses have been used instead. Finely powdered aluminium in the mixture will sensitise it to detonate more readily.

=== Explosive properties ===
ANFO is highly insensitive, making it a tertiary explosive (or a "blasting agent"). Without a sensitizer, it cannot be detonated by a typical blasting cap (such as a No. 8). A larger quantity of secondary explosive, known as a primer or a booster, must be used. One or two sticks of dynamite were historically used; current practice is to use Tovex or cast boosters of pentolite (TNT/PETN or similar compositions).

ANFO is technically a high explosive in that it decomposes through detonation rather than deflagration at a velocity higher than the speed of sound in the material, but the low sensitivity means that it is not generally regulated as such. ANFO has a moderate velocity compared to other industrial explosives, measuring 3,200 m/s in 130 mm (5 in) diameter, unconfined, at ambient temperature. It is described as a non-ideal high explosive, as its explosive velocity is far from the thermodynamic ideal due to its porosity and the phase separation of its two components.

== Industrial use ==
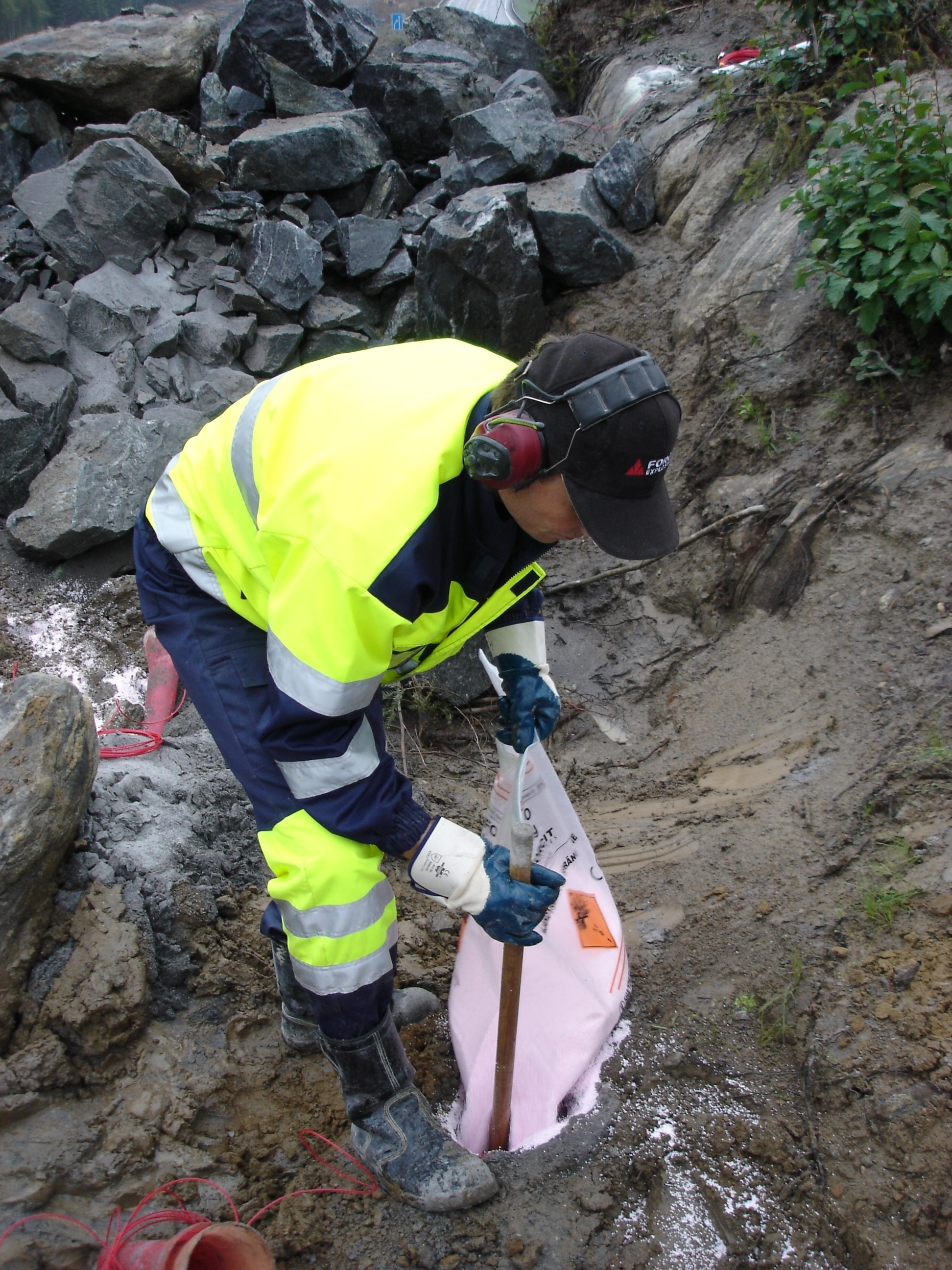
Charging a hole with ANFO for rock blasting

In the mining industry, the term ANFO specifically describes a mixture of solid ammonium nitrate prills and diesel fuel. Other explosives based on the ANFO chemistry exist; the most commonly used are emulsions. They differ from ANFO in the physical form the reactants take. The most notable properties of emulsions are water resistance and higher bulk density.

While the density of pure crystalline ammonium nitrate is 1700 kg/m^{3}, individual prills of explosive-grade AN measure approximately 1300 kg/m^{3}. Their lower density is due to the presence of a small spherical air pocket within each prill: this is the primary difference between AN sold for blasting and that sold for agricultural use. These voids are necessary to sensitize ANFO: they create so-called "hot spots". (Note: It was found by the IRA, in response to using low-brisance AN fertilizers, that "hot spots" can be created by blending powdered sugar into the ANFO mixture, effectively sensitizing the mixture to mining-standard prilled ammonium nitrate effectiveness in which the interaction of the detonation front with a spherical void concentrates energy. Blasting-grade AN prills are typically between 0.9 and 3.0 mm in diameter.) Finely powdered aluminium can be added to ANFO to increase both sensitivity and energy; in commercial usages however, this has fallen out of favor due to cost.

ANFO has a bulk density of about 840 kg/m^{3}. In surface mining applications, it is typically loaded into boreholes by dedicated trucks that mix the AN and FO components immediately before the product is dispensed. In underground mining applications, ANFO is typically blow-loaded.

AN is highly hygroscopic, readily absorbing water from air. In humid environments, absorbed water interferes with its explosive function. AN is fully water-soluble; as such, it cannot be loaded into boreholes that contain standing water. When used in wet mining conditions, considerable effort must be taken to remove standing water and install a liner in the borehole; it is generally more productive to instead use a water-resistant explosive such as emulsion.

== Regulation ==
Ammonium nitrate is widely used as a fertilizer in the agricultural industry. It is also found in instant cold packs. In many countries, its purchase and use are restricted to buyers who have obtained the proper license.

In most jurisdictions, ammonium nitrate does not need to be classified as an explosive for transport purposes; it is merely an oxidizer. Mines typically prepare ANFO on-site using the same diesel fuel that powers their vehicles. While many fuels can theoretically be used, the low volatility and cost of diesel make it ideal.

ANFO under most conditions is detonator-insensitive, so it is legally classified as a blasting agent (tertiary explosive) and not a high explosive.

== Disasters ==
Unmixed ammonium nitrate can decompose explosively, and has been responsible for several industrial disasters, including the following:

- 1921 Oppau explosion in Germany
- 1947 Texas City disaster in Texas City, Texas
- 2004 Ryongchon disaster in North Korea
- 2013 West Fertilizer Company explosion in West, Texas
- 2015 Tianjin explosions
- 2020 Beirut explosion

Environmental hazards include eutrophication in confined waters and nitrate/gas oil contamination of ground or surface water.

== Paramilitary and terrorism use ==
ANFO was used in 1970 when protests by students became violent at the University of Wisconsin–Madison, who learned how to make and use ANFO from a Wisconsin Conservation Department booklet entitled Pothole Blasting for Wildlife, resulting in the Sterling Hall bombing.

ANFO used to be widely used by the FLNC (National Liberation Front of Corsica), along with f15 explosive. Five containers of 500 kilograms (1,100 pounds) each were used to blow up the Tax Office building in Bastia on 28 February 1987.

The ANFO car bomb was adopted by the Provisional IRA in 1972 and, by 1973, the Troubles were consuming 21,000 kilograms (47,000 pounds) of ammonium nitrate for the majority of bombs. The Ulster Volunteer Force (UVF) also made use of ANFO bombs, often mixing in gelignite as a booster, in the Dublin and Monaghan bombings of May 1974 which killed 34 people & injured almost 300, ANFO car bombs were used in Dublin. It has also seen use by groups such as the Revolutionary Armed Forces of Colombia and ETA. In 1992, Shining Path perpetrated the Tarata bombing in Lima, Peru, using two ANFO truck bombs. A similar setup, mixed with nitromethane, was used in the 1995 Oklahoma City bombing by American anti-government extremist Timothy McVeigh and his accomplices to target the Alfred P. Murrah Federal Building in Oklahoma City, killing 168 and inuring 684.

The Shijiazhuang bombings rocked the city of Shijiazhuang, China, on 16 March 2001. A total of 108 people were killed, and 38 others injured when, within a short time, several ANFO bombs exploded near four apartment buildings.

In November 2009, the government of the North West Frontier Province (NWFP) of Pakistan imposed a ban on ammonium sulfate, ammonium nitrate, and calcium ammonium nitrate fertilizers in the Upper Dir, Lower Dir, Swat, Chitral and Malakand districts (the former Malakand Division) following reports that those chemicals were used by militants to make explosives.

In April 2010, police in Greece confiscated 180 kg of ANFO and other related material stashed in a hideaway in the Athens suburb of Kareas. The material was believed to be linked to attacks previously carried out by the "Revolutionary Struggle" terrorist group.

In January 2010, President Hamid Karzai of Afghanistan also issued a decree banning the use, production, storage, purchase, or sale of ammonium nitrate, after an investigation showed militants in the Taliban insurgency had used the substance in bomb attacks.

On 22 July 2011, an aluminum powder-enriched ANNM explosive, with total size of 950 kg (150 kg of aluminium powder), increasing demolition power by 10–30% over plain ANFO, was used in the Oslo bombing.

On 13 April 2016, two suspected IRA members were stopped in Dublin with 67 kg of ANFO.

On 6 March 2018, eight members of the extreme right neo-Nazi group Combat 18 were arrested in Athens, Greece, accused of multiple attacks on immigrants and activists. They had 50 kg of ANFO in their possession.
