= Ruth Witt-Diamant =

Ruth Witt-Diamant was an English professor at San Francisco State Teachers College from 1931.

Witt-Diamant earned a bachelor's degree from the University of California, Berkeley in 1925 and a master's degree there in 1927. She later undertook advanced study at Syracuse University, the University of Southern California, and UC Berkeley.

Witt-Diamant founded, and was the first director of the Poetry Center at SFSU in 1954.Robert Duncan was assistant director, 1956-57. Witt-Diamant was director of the Poetry Center until her retirement in 1961, when James Schevill became director.

She hosted many famous poets in her guest room when she owned the house at 1520 Willard Street. Among the writers who slept here were Anaïs Nin, W. H. Auden, Elizabeth Bishop, James Broughton, Robert Lowell, Stephen Spender and Theodore Roethke, but probably the most famous was Dylan Thomas, a good and close friend of hers, who wrote some rather droll poems about the beer that "magically appeared" in Ruth's icebox.

After she retired, in 1961, at age 65, she traveled and taught English poetry at Tokyo University in Japan, becoming a good friend of the Tokugawa family and especially Mrs. Tokugawa. She met Mrs. Tokugawa at a party she attended at the English Embassy in Tokyo, with her friends in the diplomatic service, the McAlpines. She also went on a pilgrimage to Mt. Fuji with Mrs. Tokugawa and her poems, written at the nightly stops, are now held by her son, Stephen Witt Diamant.

The Ruth Witt-Diamant Poetry Prize is awarded in her name by San Francisco State University Poetry Center.

== Media ==
- Exploring the arts in the Bay Area: poetry Pacifica Radio Archives via archive.org

"Ruth Witt-Diamant, Mark Linenthal, Stan Rice, Thomas Albright, Mark Green, and Dr. Francis Rigney (author and psychiatrist) discuss the poetry scene in the Bay Area", Produced by students from San Francisco State College
