= POETICS list =

Mailing list for the discussion of poetry in North America

The University at Buffalo POETICS listserv (informally and variously known as UBPOETICS or the POETICS list) was one of the oldest and most widely known mailing lists devoted to the discussion of contemporary North American poetry and poetics. It began on 8 December 1993, although the most easily accessible archive only contains messages from after the middle of 1994. A number of influential poets and critics associated with various movements in contemporary poetry, including Marjorie Perloff and Charles Bernstein, were list subscribers. Estimates of list membership numbers vary, but were around 1800 readers. The list was discontinued in 2014.

It was run on servers owned by University at Buffalo, and was associated with the school's graduate program in poetics. It was a closed list with submitted postings selected by the administrator and editor Amy King. The list had undergone numerous controversies over the years. In 1999, Bernstein briefly shut down the list allegedly in response to a large number of postings by one subscriber, Henry Gould, who denied his postings as the cause. The list later reopened. The list provided for a mild amount of moderation by the list owners, with most messages "pre-approved"; the new list rules also state that:

"We generally do not accept postings of creative work not directed toward a discussion of poetics issues on the list. The Poetics List is not a venue for the posting of free-standing, personal poems or journal entries. However, the Poetics List editor may occasionally solicit or approve poems for posting on the list."

In the early days of the list, membership, list discussions and even the existence of the list itself were kept private, and members were required not to discuss the contents of list postings or the list itself with "outsiders." People who wished to join the list were asked to provide a short "personal statement" before being approved. "Real names" were also required. These requirements were relaxed in later years.

In 2001 the list served as the main forum for a protest against the appointment of Billy Collins as Poet Laureate Consultant in Poetry to the Library of Congress. Members of the list participated in the election of an anti-laureate run by Robert Archambeau. Anselm Hollo was elected to this honorary position
