= Ethylammonium nitrate =

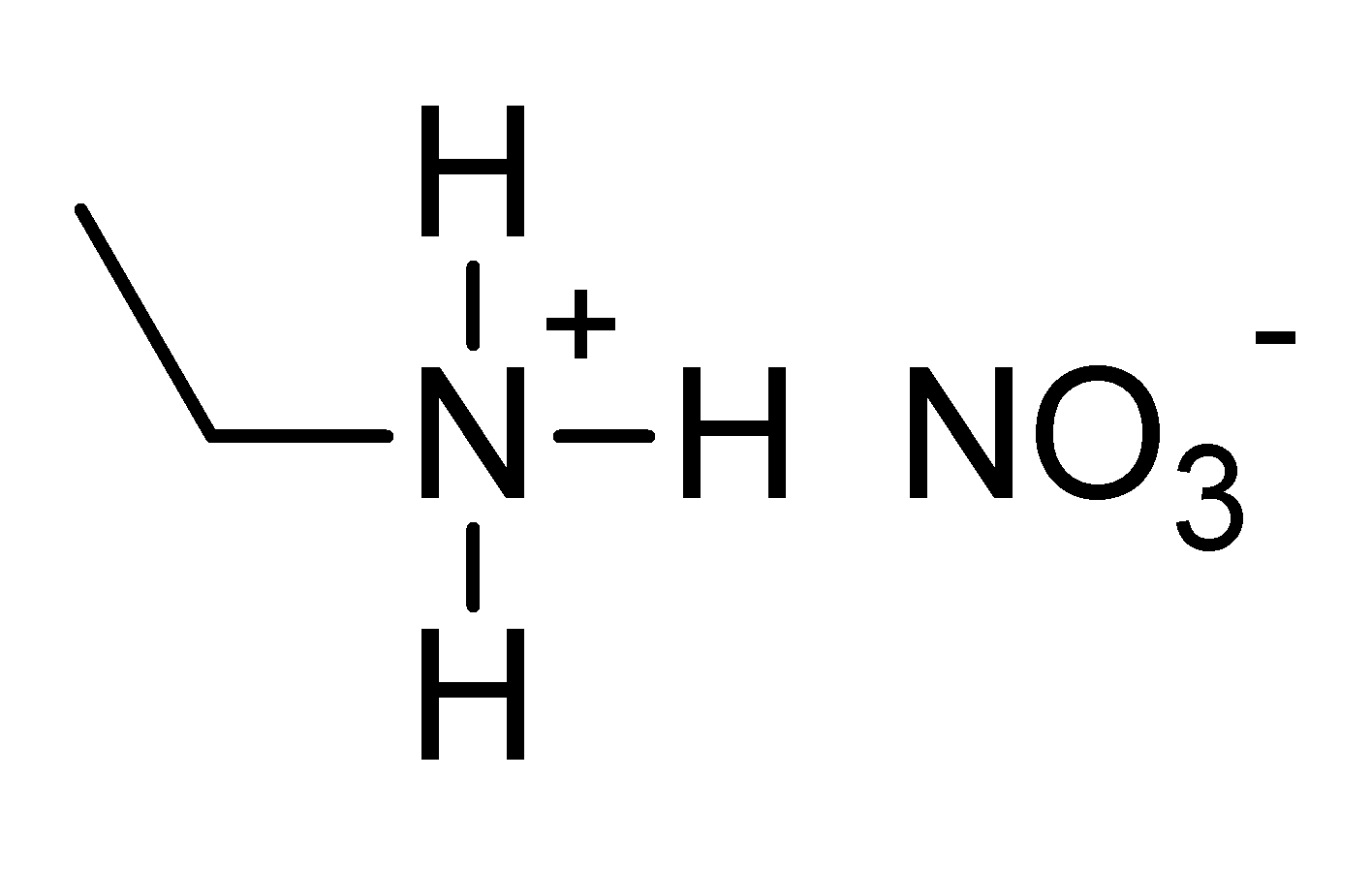
Partially condensed, skeletal formula of ethylammonium nitrate with some explicit hydrogens added
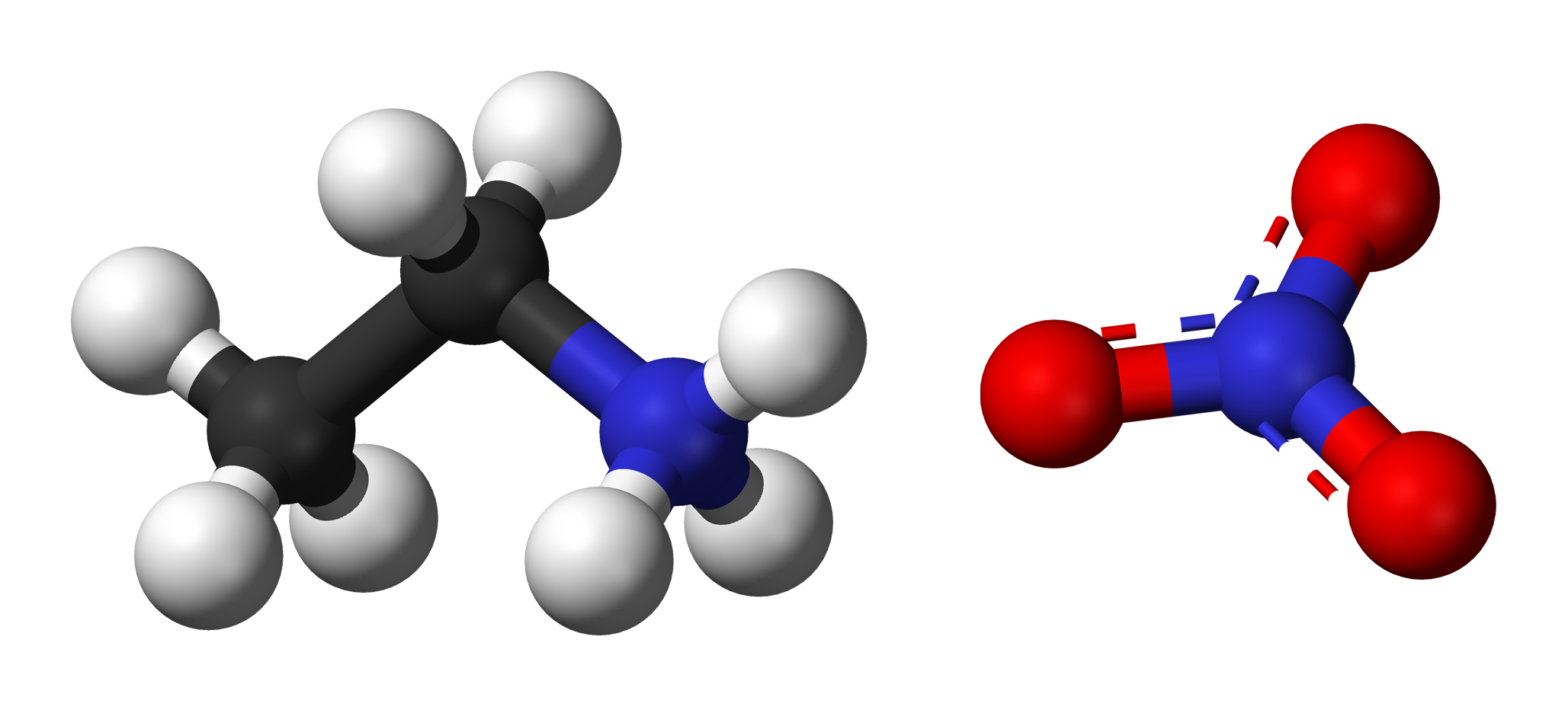
Ball and stick model of ethylammonium nitrate

Names
- IUPAC name Ethanaminium nitrate

Identifiers
CAS Number	22113-86-6
3D model (JSmol)	Interactive image
ChEBI	CHEBI:63882
ChemSpider	4937507
ECHA InfoCard	100.218.244
EC Number	690-858-8
PubChem CID	6432248
CompTox Dashboard (EPA)	DTXSID0047901
- InChI: InChI=1S/C2H7N.NO3/c1-2-3;2-1(3)4/h2-3H2,1H3;/q;-1/p+1 Key: AHRQMWOXLCFNAV-UHFFFAOYSA-O; InChI=1/C2H7N.NO3/c1-2-3;2-1(3)4/h2-3H2,1H3;/q;-1/p+1 Key: AHRQMWOXLCFNAV-IKLDFBCSAI
- SMILES: CC[NH3+].[N+](=O)([O-])[O-]

Properties
Chemical formula	[CH_{3}CH_{2}NH_{3}]^{+}[NO_{3}]^{−}
Molar mass	108.0965 g/mol
Appearance	Colorless liquid
Density	1.261 g/ml
Melting point	12 °C (54 °F; 285 K)
Boiling point	240 °C (464 °F; 513 K)

Thermochemistry
Heat capacity (C)	206 J/(mol·K)

Hazards
- Occupational safety and health (OHS/OSH)
Main hazards	Irritant
- GHS labelling
Pictograms	(GHS07: Exclamation mark)
Signal word	Warning
Hazard statements	H315, H319, H335
Precautionary statements	P220, P261, P280, P312
- Safety data sheet (SDS)

Related compounds
Other cations	Methylammonium nitrate
- Except where otherwise noted, data are given for materials in their standard state (at 25 °C [77 °F], 100 kPa). verify (what is ?) Infobox references

Ethylammonium nitrate or ethylamine nitrate (EAN) is a salt with formula [CH_{3}CH_{2}NH_{3}]^{+}[NO_{3}]^{−}. It is an odorless and colorless to slightly yellowish liquid with a melting point of 12 °C. This compound was described by Paul Walden in 1914, and is believed to be the earliest reported example of a room-temperature ionic liquid.

== Synthesis and properties ==
Ethylammonium nitrate can be produced by heating ethyl nitrate with an alcoholic solution of ammonia or by reacting ethylamine with concentrated nitric acid. It has a relatively low viscosity of 0.28 poise or 0.028 Pa·s at 25 °C and therefore a high electrical conductivity of about 20 mS·cm^{−1} at 25 °C. It boils at 240 °C and decomposes at about 250 °C. Its density at 20 °C is 1.261 g/cm^{3}.

The ethylammonium ion (CH_{3}CH_{2}NH^{+}_{3}) has three easily detachable protons which are tetrahedrally arranged around the central nitrogen atom, whereas the configuration of the NO^{−}_{3} anion is planar. Despite the structural differences, EAN shares many properties with water, such as micelle formation, aggregation of hydrocarbons, negative enthalpy and entropy of dissolution of gases, etc. Similar to water, EAN can form three-dimensional hydrogen bonding networks.

== Applications ==
Ethylammonium nitrate is used as an electrically conductive solvent in electrochemistry and as a protein crystallization agent. It has a positive effect on the refolding of denaturated lysozyme, with the refolding yield of about 90%. The refolding action was explained as follows: The ethyl group of ethylammonium nitrate interacts with the hydrophobic part of the protein and thereby protects it from intermolecular association, whereas the charged part of EAN stabilizes the electrostatic interactions.
