= Prill =

Small aggregate or globule of a material

A prill is a small aggregate or globule of a material, most often a dry sphere, formed from a melted liquid through spray crystallization.

Prilled is a term used in mining and manufacturing to refer to a product that has been pelletized. ANFO explosive typically comprises ammonium nitrate prills mixed with #2 fuel oil. The pellets are a neater, simpler form for handling, with reduced dust.

The material to be prilled must be in a solid state at room temperature and a low-viscosity liquid when melted. Prills are formed by allowing drops of the melted prill substance to congeal or freeze in mid-air after being dripped from the top of a tall prilling tower. Certain agrochemicals such as urea are often supplied in prilled form. Fertilizers (ammonium nitrate, urea, NPK fertilizer) and some detergent powders are commonly manufactured as prills. However prilling of ammonium nitrate and urea has in recent years been replaced by fluid bed granulation as this gives strong and more abrasion-resistant granules.

Melted material may also be atomized and then allowed to form smaller prills that are useful in cosmetics, food, and animal feed.

== See also ==
- Shot (pellet)
