= Gmelin-Beilstein Medal =

German chemistry prize

The Gmelin-Beilstein Medal is a prize of the German Chemical Society for scientists and scholars who have made an outstanding contribution to the history of chemistry, chemistry literature or chemical information. It is awarded with a silver medal and 7,500 euros in prize money and was first awarded in 1954 and donated by Hoechst AG. It is named after Leopold Gmelin and Friedrich Konrad Beilstein, who were known for their colossal handbooks.

== Awarded ==
- 1954 Paul Walden, Maximilian Pflücke
- 1956 Friedrich Richter
- 1958 Wilhelm Foerst
- 1962 Erich Pietsch
- 1965 Jean Baptiste Gillis
- 1966 Eduard Kreuzhage
- 1973 Werner Schultheis
- 1976 Hans Rudolf Christen
- 1977 Günter Kresze
- 1980 Margot Becke-Goehring
- 1981 Fred A. Tate
- 1983 Robert Fugmann, Ernst Meyer
- 1987 Jürgen Schaafhausen
- 1988 Gerd M. Ahrenholz
- 1990 Christian Weiske
- 1991 Johann Gasteiger
- 1995 Christoph Meinel
- 2000 Peter Gölitz
- 2002 Ursula Schoch-Grübler
- 2005 Ute Deichmann
- 2007 Olga Kennard
- 2010 Jürgen Gmehling
- 2012 Engelbert Zaß
- 2014 Henning Hopf
- 2016 Joe P. Richmond
- 2018 René Deplanque
- 2020 Guillermo Restrepo
- 2022 Gisbert Schneider
- 2024 Eva E. Wille
- 2026 Helmut Maier
