= Tovex =

Water-gel explosive

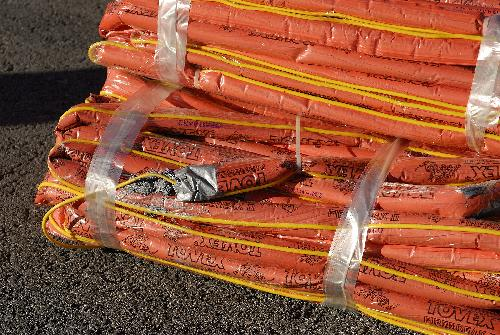
Tovex Firebreak II used on Upper Bear Creek Trail in the Angeles National Forest

Tovex (also known as Trenchrite, Seismogel, and Seismopac) is a water-gel explosive composed of ammonium nitrate and methylammonium nitrate that has several advantages over traditional dynamite, including lower toxicity and safer manufacture, transport, and storage. It has thus almost entirely replaced dynamite. There are numerous versions ranging from shearing charges to aluminized common blasting agents. Tovex is used by 80% of international oil companies for seismic exploration.

== History ==
The Tovex family of products, sometimes generically called "water gels," were developed by the Explosives Department at DuPont (E.I. du Pont de Nemours & Company, Inc.) in the mid-to-late 1960s when pelletized TNT was included in aqueous gels to create a slurry form of ANFO that displayed water-resistant properties in wet bore holes. TNT-sensitized water gels were commercially successful, but the TNT led to problems with oxygen balance: namely elevated amounts of combustion by-products such as carbon monoxide and nitrogen-dioxide complexes. Not only was TNT "dirty," it was also expensive. TNT was eliminated through the work of DuPont chemists Colin Dunglinson, Joseph Dean Chrisp Sr. and William Lyerly along with a team of others at DuPont's Potomac River Development Laboratory (PRDL) at Falling Waters, West Virginia, and at DuPont's Eastern Laboratories (EL) at Gibbstown, New Jersey. These chemists and engineers formulated a series of water gel-base products that replaced the TNT with methyl ammonium nitrate, also known as monomethylamine nitrate, or PR-M, (which stands for "Potomac River – monomethylamine nitrate"), creating the "Tovex Extra" product line.

In late 1973, DuPont declared "the last days of dynamite" and switched to the new Tovex formula. The "Tovex" (that replaced nitroglycerin-based dynamite) had evolved into a cap-sensitive product. Even though it bore the same name as the earlier "Tovex," it was quite different from the precursors, which could only be initiated in large diameters (5 inches) with a one-pound TNT booster. The new Tovex of the mid-to-late 1970s could be detonated in (critical) diameters much smaller than 5 inches by utilizing DuPont's Detaflex, thus making the new Tovex a realistic replacement for dynamite.

Until then, only nitroglycerin-based explosives were commercially feasible for blasters who wanted cap-sensitive explosives that could be initiated with a #6 blasting cap in bore holes as small as 3/4 of an inch in diameter, sometimes less. The new Tovex satisfied that requirement.

Atlas, Hercules, IRECO, Trojan-US Powder and several other explosives manufacturing firms of the era created emulsions, gels and slurries which accomplished the same end, but it was the DuPont patent of PR-M based explosives (U.S. patent 3,431,155) that gave the DuPont Company a competitive edge.

DuPont stopped producing nitroglycerine-based dynamite in 1976, replacing it with Tovex. In 1980, it sold its Tovex technology to Explosive Technology International (ETI), a Canadian company. One ETI licensee is Biafo Industries Limited, headquartered in Islamabad, Pakistan.

As of 2008, explosives sold under DuPont's original "Tovex" trade name are distributed in Europe by Societe Suisse des Explosifs, Brigue, in Switzerland.

== Properties ==
Tovex is a 50/50 aqueous solution of ammonium nitrate and methylammonium nitrate (sometimes also called monomethylamine nitrate, or PR-M), sensitized fuels, and other ingredients including sodium nitrate prills, finely divided (paint-grade) aluminum, finely divided coal, proprietary materials to make some grades cap sensitive, and thickening agents to enhance water resistance and to act as crystal modifiers. The detonation velocity of Tovex is around 4,000 to 5,500 m·s^{−1}. The specific gravity is 0.8–1.4. Tovex looks like a fluid gel which can be white to black in color.

== Ingredients ==
- sodium nitrate
- ammonium nitrate
- methylammonium nitrate (sometimes called "Monomethylamine Nitrate")
- calcium nitrate
- aluminium
- fuel oil No.2
- carbonaceous fuel
- perlite
- silica (fibrous glass)
- ethylene glycol
- guar gum

== Uses ==
- avalanche control
- blasting for road construction
- mining for minerals
- quarrying for the construction and building industry
- seismic exploration
- tunneling
- improvised explosive devices
- hiking trail building
- cutting fire lines
- hazardous tree removal

== Sample applications ==
Tovex Fire Break II applied by Bear Divide Hot Shots on Upper Bear Creek Trail to remove granite in the Angeles National Forest.

The blasting product is malleable to the extent that it can be cut to length, laid out, or bundled for a wide variety of applications. Because the material requires heat and fast compression to detonate, it is safe to transport and manipulate once in the field, even if dropped from high altitudes, set on fire, or peppered with high velocity rifle bullets.

For dead trees which are considered too hazardous to remove utilizing crosscut saws or chainsaws, one or two wraps of Tovex around the base of the trunk is often enough to fell the tree safely so that the remains may be safely bucked and removed from hiking trails, parks, or other places where people recreate.

For firebreaks, the product is simply uncoiled and laid along the ground to follow the ridge line or contours of the hillside or mountain along which the fire crews wish to establish a line of defense. Fire crews then follow-up by clearing debris along the blasted line to establish a fuel-free line.

For more technical blasting which requires greater planning and finesse, Tovex is often bundled according to weight into or up against a solid material, then a detonation cord is applied to the Tovex to create a fast moving, heated dynamo effect within the Tovex when one or more blasting caps ignite the detonation cord, thus accelerating the Tovex, which causes it to detonate.

Blasting caps are ignited utilizing hand-held control boxes which employ a series of safety interlocks and switches which require a strict radio sessioning handshake protocol between the unit which ignites the cap and the unit used by the Master Blaster controlling the shot, designed to prevent the emplaced Tovex, detonation cord, and caps from igniting prematurely.

After detonation, the material is completely utilized; there is no discernible residue, unless one employs microscopic analysis. Typically, Tovex and other commercial explosives employ embedded taggants which identify the product and often the agency which purchased the material.

== Features ==
- cap sensitive
- wide range of bore hole densities
- improved flexibility in loading
- water-resistance
- no nitroglycerin and noxious fumes
- reduced handling, transportation and storage hazards
- high bubble energy (underwater explosion)
- reduced sound levels and better control on vibrations
