= Erkki Toivanen =

Finnish television journalist (1938–2011)

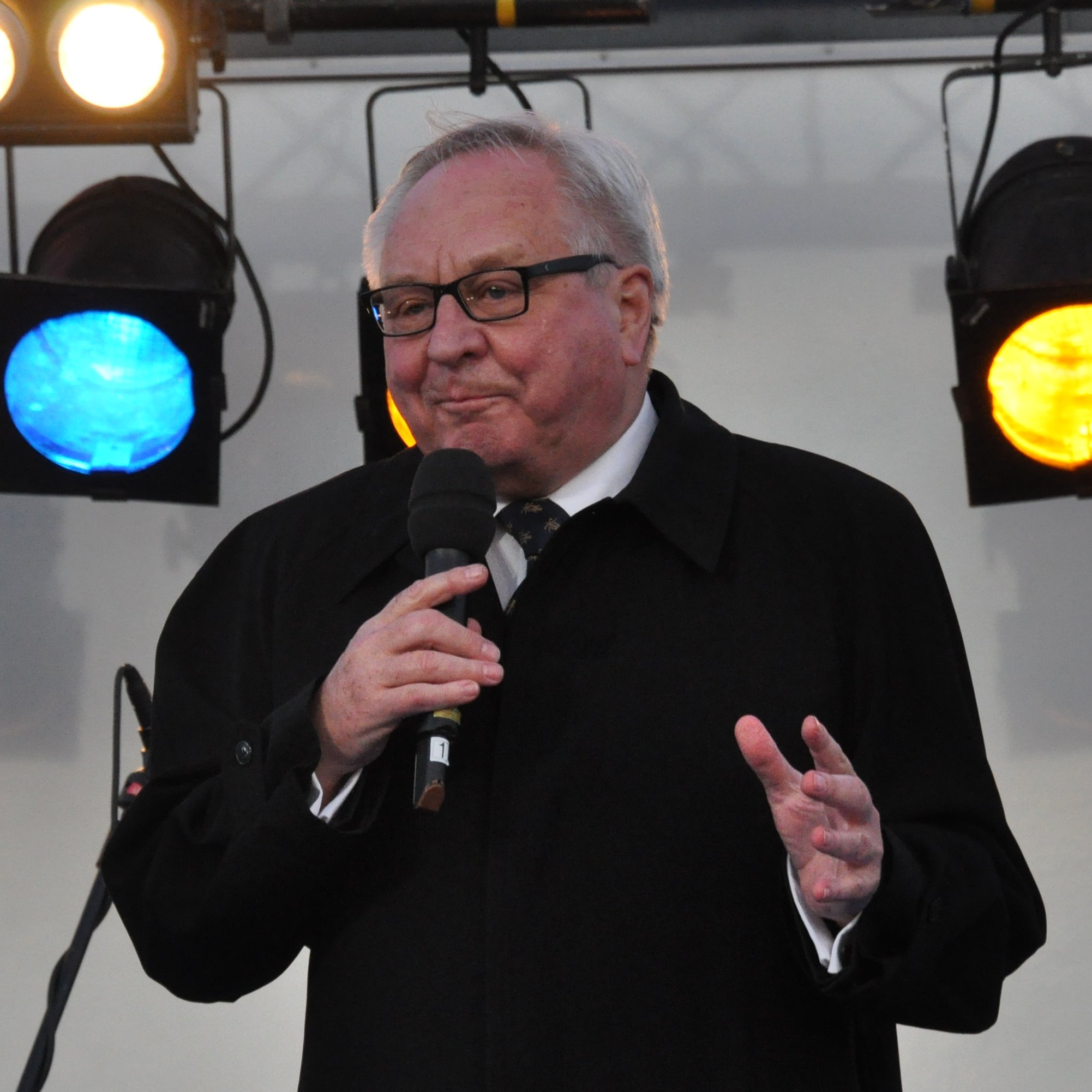
- Erkki Toivanen in 2009
- Born: Erkki Matti Toivanen; 18 May 1938; Kuopio, Finland
- Died: 21 July 2011 (aged 73); London, England, United Kingdom
- Education: University of Helsinki
- Occupations: Broadcaster, Journalist
- Employer: Yle
- Partner: Lennox Walker (1972- death 2011)
- Children: 1
- Parent(s): Paavo Toivanen and Adele Toivanen (née Konga)

Erkki Matti Toivanen (18 May 1938 – 21 July 2011) was a Finnish journalist and presenter for Yleisradio.

== Career ==
After gaining a master's degree in political history from the University of Helsinki in 1962, Toivanen joined the Finnish section of BBC World Service. One of his tasks there was to produce the music to the radio dramas written by Anselm Hollo and Matti Rossi.

In 1968, he was promoted to newsreader on television and radio, and from 1969 until 1972, he worked as the foreign news editor; in the same year he joined Yle as a news correspondent and broadcaster. His broadcasting career included commentating on four Eurovision Song Contest (1977–1978, 1982 & 1987) and hosting the Finnish coverage of the Summer Olympics on eight occasions between 1972 and 2000. From 1987 until 1994, he worked as a Yle TV1 news reporter, and from 1995 until 2000 as a special correspondent. He retired from Yle in 2001.

== Personal life ==
Toivanen was openly gay. He was married to a woman between 1963 and 1966. The marriage gave birth to a daughter in 1964. Since 1972, he was with long-time partner Lennox Walker, former manager of the T. Rex-band.

Toivanen suffered a stroke on July 14, 2010 and a new one three weeks later. In October of that year, he was diagnosed with a small tumor in his brain, which was cut in December 2010. Despite his treatments, he died on 21 July 2011 in London while sleeping. In accordance with his will his ashes were scattered over the Blanchisseuse Beach of Walker's Trinidadian home, just like Toivanen himself had fulfilled the will of his Estonian-born mother in Narva-Jõesuu. Toivanen was fluent in Finnish, English, Estonian, German, Russian and French.
