= Paul Walden =

Russian chemist (1863–1957)

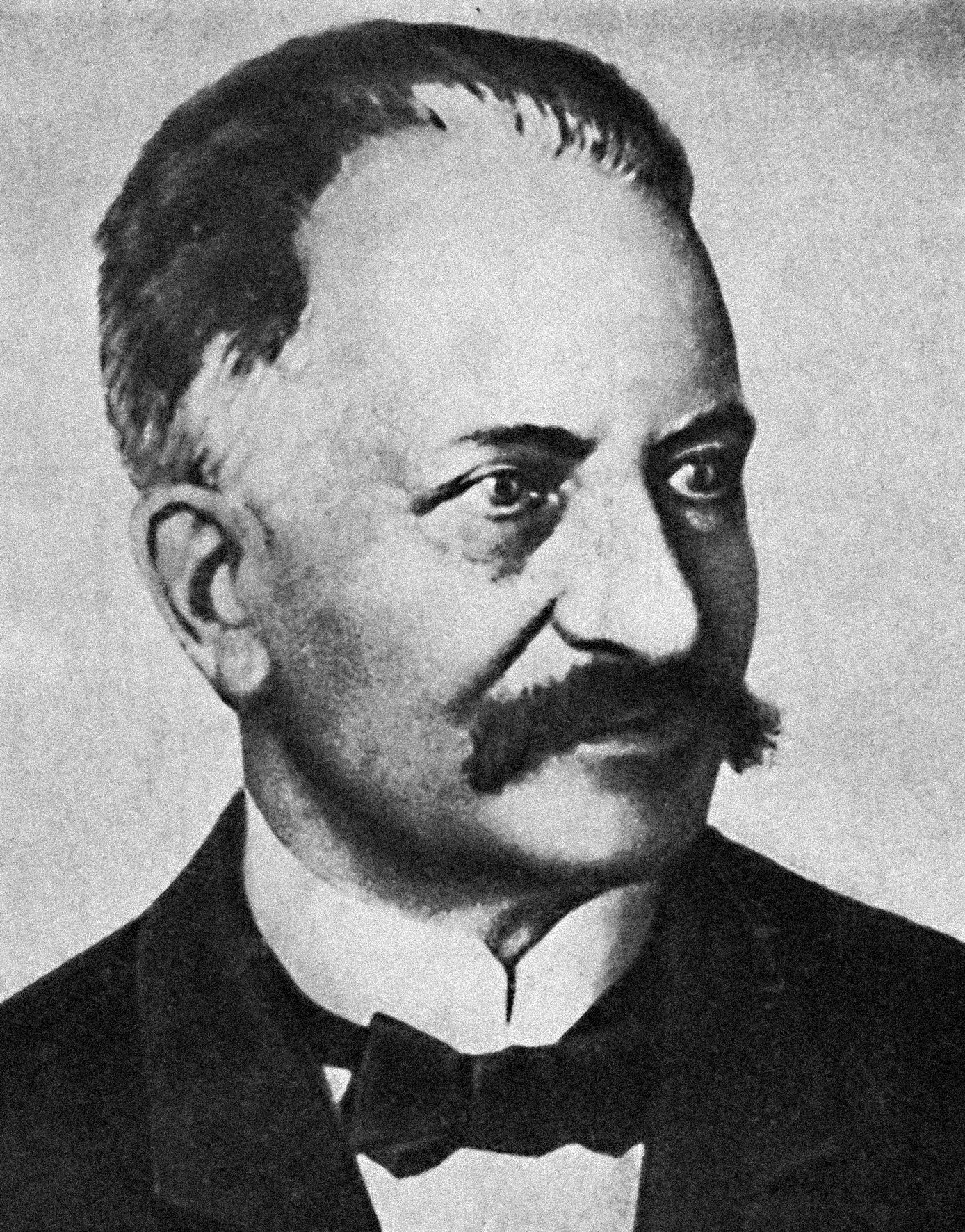
- Paul Walden
- Born: 26 July 1863; Rozulas, Livonia Governorate, Russian Empire
- Died: 22 January 1957 (aged 93); Gammertingen, West Germany
- Education: Riga Technical University
- Known for: Walden inversion Walden's rule Ethylammonium nitrate
- Awards: Gmelin-Beilstein Medal (1954)
- Scientific career
- Workplaces: University of Rostock

Paul Walden (Latvian: Pauls Valdens; Russian: Павел Иванович Вальден; German: Paul von Walden; 26 July 1863 – 22 January 1957) was a Russian, Latvian and German chemist known for his work in stereochemistry and history of chemistry. In particular, he discovered Walden's rule, he invented the stereochemical reaction known as Walden inversion and synthesized the first room-temperature ionic liquid, ethylammonium nitrate.

== Early life and education ==
Walden was born in Rozulas in the Russian Empire (now Stalbe parish, Pārgauja municipality, Latvia) in a large Latvian peasant family. At the age of four, he lost his father and later his mother. Thanks to financial support from his two older brothers who lived in Riga (one was a merchant and another served as a lieutenant in the military) Walden managed to complete his education – first graduated with honors from the district school in the town of Cēsis (1876), and then from the Riga Technical High School (1882).

In December 1882, he enrolled into the Riga Technical University and became seriously interested in chemistry. In 1886, he published his first scientific study on the color evaluation of the reactions of nitric and nitrous acid with various reagents and establishing the limits of sensitivity of the color method to detection of nitric acid.

In April 1887, Walden became an active member of the Russian Physico-chemical Society. During this time, Walden started his collaboration with Wilhelm Ostwald (Nobel Prize in Chemistry 1909) which greatly influenced his development as a scientist. Their first work together was published in 1887 and was devoted to the dependence of the electrical conductivity of aqueous solutions of salts on their molecular weight.

== Work in chemistry ==
In 1888, Walden graduated from the university with a degree in chemical engineering and continued working at the Chemistry Department as an assistant to professor C. Bischof.

Under his guidance, Walden began compiling "Handbook of Stereochemistry" which was published in 1894. In preparation of this handbook, Walden had to perform numerous chemical syntheses and characterizations which resulted in 57 journal papers on stereochemistry alone, published between 1889 and 1900 in Russian and foreign journals 57 articles on the stereochemistry. He also continued his research in the field of physical chemistry, establishing in 1889 that the ionizing power of non-aqueous solvent is directly proportional to the dielectric constant.

During the summer vacations of 1890 and 1891, Walden was visiting Ostwald at the University of Leipzig and in September 1891 defended there a master thesis on the affinity values of certain organic acids. Ostwald suggested that he stay in Leipzig as a private lecturer, but Walden declined, hoping for a better career in Riga.

In the summer of 1892 he was appointed assistant professor of physical chemistry. A year later he defended his doctorate on osmotic phenomena in sedimentary layers and in September 1894 became professor of analytical and physical chemistry at the Riga Technical University. He worked there until 1911 and during 1902–1905 was rector of the university. In 1895, Walden made his most remarkable discovery which was later named Walden inversion, namely that various stereoisomers can be obtained from the same compound via certain exchange reactions involving hydrogen. This topic became the basis for his habilitation thesis defended in March 1899 at St. Petersburg University.

After that, Walden became interested in electrochemistry of nonaqueous solutions. In 1902, he proposed a theory of autodissociation of inorganic and organic solvents. In 1905, he found a relationship between the maximum molecular conductivity and viscosity of the medium and in 1906, coined the term "solvation". Together with his work on stereochemistry, these results brought him to prominence; in particular, he was considered a candidate for the Nobel Prize in Chemistry in 1913 and 1914.

Walden was also credited as a talented chemistry lecturer. In his memoirs, he wrote: "My audience usually was crowded and the feedback of sympathetic listeners gave me strength ... my lectures I was giving spontaneously, to bring freshness to the subject ... I never considered teaching as a burden".

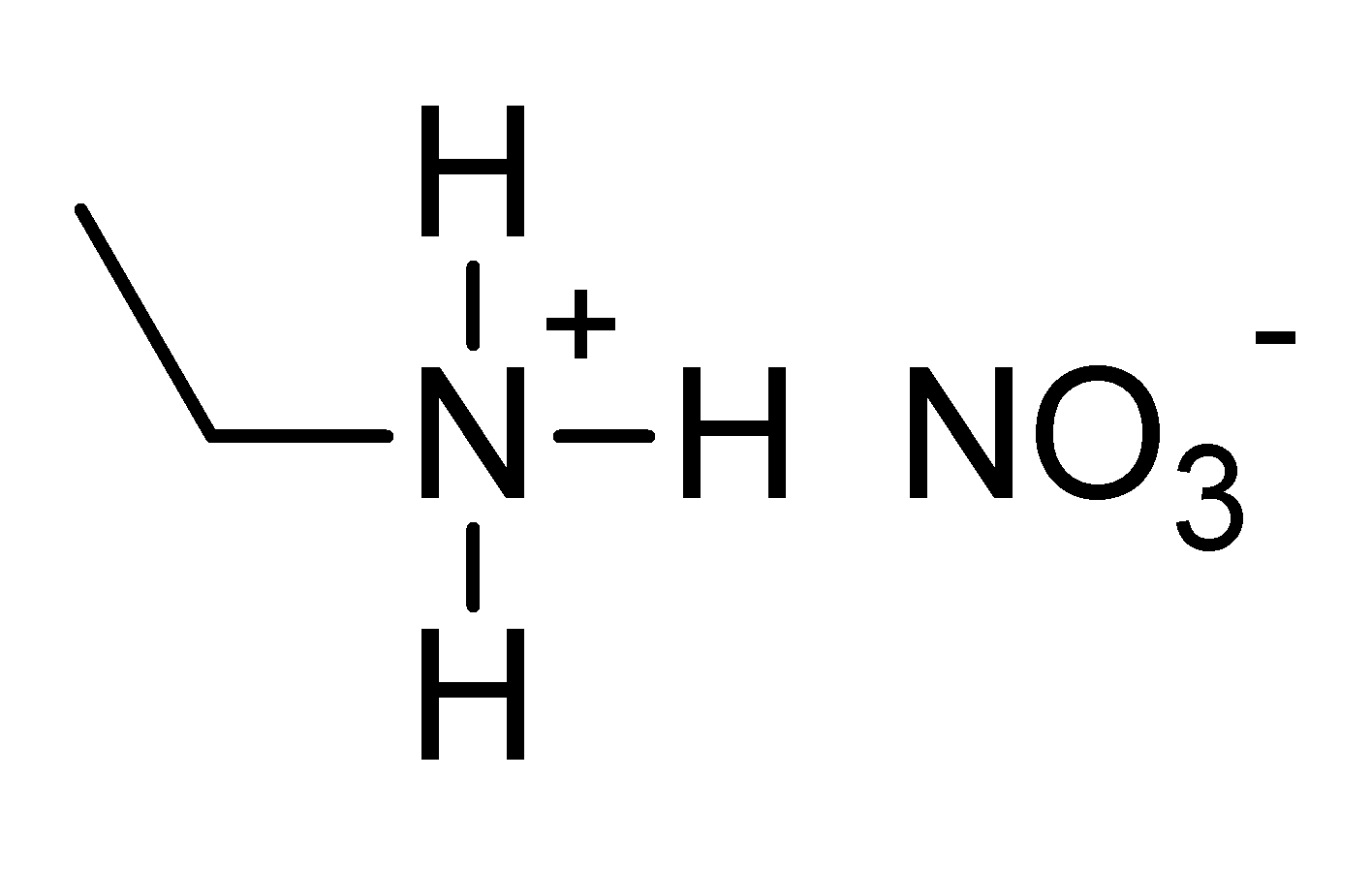
Ethylammonium nitrate

1896 brought reforms to the Riga Technical University. Whereas previously, all teaching was conducted in German and Walden was the only professor giving some courses in Russian, from then on, Russian became the official language. This change allowed receiving subsidies from the Russian government and helped the alumni in obtaining positions in Russia. These reforms resulted in another and rather unusual collaboration of Walden with Ostwald: Walden was rebuilding the Chemistry Department and Ostwald sent him the blueprints of the chemical laboratories in Leipzig as an example. In May 1910, Walden was elected a member of the St. Petersburg Academy of Sciences and in 1911 was invited to Saint Petersburg to lead the Chemical Laboratories of the academy founded in 1748, by Mikhail Lomonosov. He remained in that position till 1919. As an exception, he was allowed to stay in Riga where he had better research possibilities, but he was traveling, almost every week, by train, to St. Petersburg for the academy meetings and guidance of research. In the period 1911–1915, Walden published 14 articles in the "Proceedings of the Academy of Sciences" on electrochemistry of nonaqueous solutions. In particular, in 1914 he synthesized the first room-temperature ionic liquid, namely ethylammonium nitrate (C_{2}H_{5})NH^{+}_{3}·NO^{−}_{3} with the melting point of 12 °C.

After 1915, due to the difficulties caused by the World War I, political unrest in Russia and then October Revolution, Walden had reduced his research activity and focused on teaching and administrative work, taking numerous leading positions in science. Due to the political unrest in Latvia, Walden had immigrated to Germany. He was appointed as professor of inorganic chemistry at the University of Rostock where he worked until retirement in 1934. In 1924 he was invited back to Riga, where he gave a series of lectures. He was offered leading positions in chemistry in Riga and in St. Petersburg, but declined. Despite his emigration, Walden retained his popularity in Russia, and in 1927 he was appointed as a foreign member of the Russian Academy of Sciences. Later, he also became a member of the Swedish (1928) and Finnish (1932) Academies.

== Personal life ==
Walden's daughter, Antonina Anna Walden (1899–1983), was a music teacher who married Finnish translator and essayist Juho August Hollo. Their son was the Finnish poet and translator Anselm Hollo.

== Late years ==
In his last years, Walden focused on history of chemistry and collected a unique library of over 10,000 volumes. The library and his house were destroyed when the British bombed Rostock in 1942. Walden moved to Berlin and then to Frankfurt am Main, where he became a visiting professor of the history of chemistry at the local university. He met the end of World War II in the French Occupation Zone, cut off from Rostock University, located in the Soviet Zone, and thus left without any source of income.

Walden survived on a modest pension arranged by German chemists, giving occasional lectures in Tübingen and writing memoirs. In 1949, he published his best-known book, History of Chemistry. He died in Gammertingen in 1957, at the age of 93. His memoirs were published only in 1974.

== Sources ==
- "Вальден, Павел Иванович" . Brockhaus and Efron Encyclopedic Dictionary (in Russian). 1906.
