= Anselm Hollo =

Finnish poet and translator (1934–2013)

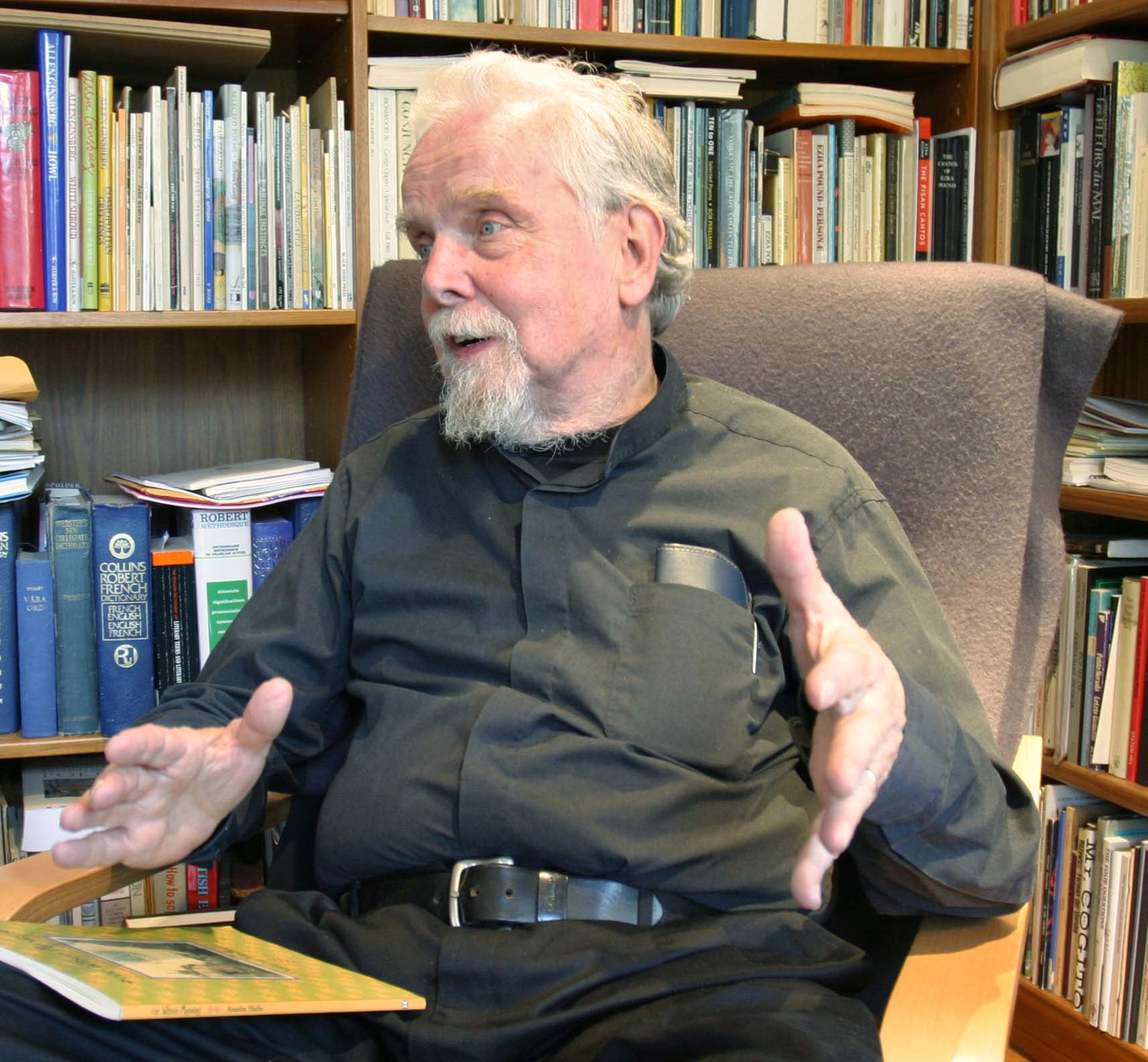
- Hollo during the making of Add-Verse, 2005
- Born: Paavo Anselm Aleksis Hollo; 12 April 1934; Helsinki, Finland
- Died: 29 January 2013 (aged 78); Boulder, Colorado, U.S.
- Other name: Anselm Paul Alexis Hollo
- Occupations: Poet and translator
- Spouses: Josephine Clare; Jane Dalrymple
- Children: 3
- Father: Juho August Hollo
- Relatives: Paul Walden (maternal grandfather)

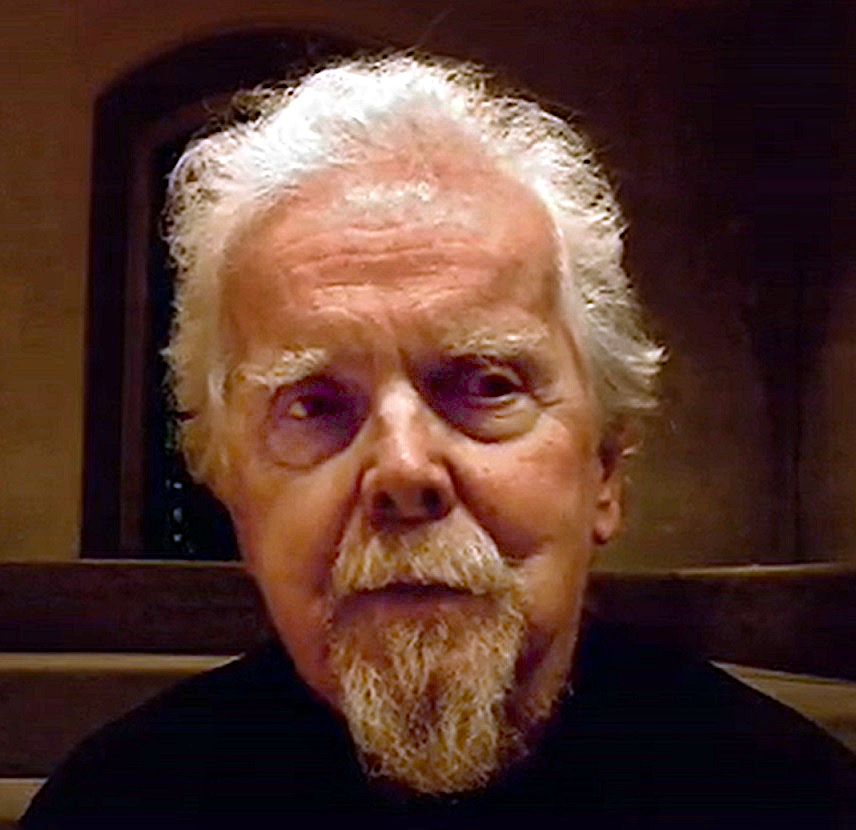
Hollo in Speaking Portraits

Anselm Hollo 'Why there is a Cat Curfew in my House".

Anselm Paul Alexis Hollo (12 April 1934 – 29 January 2013) was a Finnish poet and translator. He lived in the United States from 1967 until his death in January 2013.

Hollo published more than forty titles of poetry in the United Kingdom and in the United States, with a style strongly influenced by the American beat poets and the New York School.

== Personal life ==
Paavo Anselm Aleksis Hollo was born in Helsinki, Finland. His father, Juho August Hollo (1885–1967) — who liked to be known as "J. A." Hollo — was professor of pedagogy at the University of Helsinki, an essayist, and a major translator of literature into Finnish. His mother was Iris Antonina Anna Walden (1899–1983), a music teacher and daughter of organic chemist Paul Walden. He lived for eight years in the United Kingdom, and had three children (Hannes, Kaarina, and Tamsin) with his first wife, poet Josephine Clare. He was a permanent resident in the United States from the late 1960s until his death. At the time of his death, he resided in Boulder, Colorado, with his second wife, artist Jane Dalrymple-Hollo.

== Career ==
In the 1960s, Hollo lived in London, England, and worked at the Finnish section of BBC World Service. One of his tasks there was to write radio dramas in Finnish, together with another Finnish poet, Matti Rossi. The music to their productions was written by Erkki Toivanen.

Around this time, Hollo was also beginning to make a name for himself as a poet in the English language. In 1965, he performed at the "underground" International Poetry Incarnation, London. Also in the same year, the first customer of the Indica Bookshop, a certain Paul McCartney, is known to have bought, among other things, the book & it is a song by Anselm Hollo the day before the bookshop was officially opened.

In 2001, poets and critics associated with the SUNY Buffalo POETICS list elected Hollo to the honorary position of "anti-laureate", in protest at the appointment of Billy Collins to the position of Poet Laureate Consultant in Poetry to the Library of Congress.

Hollo translated poetry and belles-lettres from Finnish, German, Swedish, and French into English. He was one of the early translators of Allen Ginsberg into German and Finnish.

Hollo taught creative writing in eighteen different institutions of higher learning, including SUNY Buffalo, the Iowa Writers' Workshop, and the University of Colorado at Boulder. From 1985, he taught in the Jack Kerouac School of Disembodied Poetics at Naropa University, where he held the rank of Full Professor.

Several of his poems have been set into music by pianist and composer Frank Carlberg. Poets Ted Berrigan and Alice Notley named their son Anselm Berrigan after Hollo.

Hollo became ill during the summer of 2012 and had brain surgery. He died from post-operative pneumonia on 29 January 2013, at the age of 78.

== Awards ==
- 1979: NEA and Poets Foundation fellowships
- 1996: Gertrude Stein Award in Innovative American Poetry 1995–1996
- 1996: Finnish State Award for Foreign Translators
- 2001: best book of poems Award by the San Francisco Poetry Center, for Notes on the Possibilities and Attractions of Existence: New and Selected Poems 1965–2000
- 2004: Harold Morton Landon Translation Award

== Selected publications ==
- Sateiden välillä, runoja. Otava, Helsinki 1956
- & (And) what else is new : a small pamphlet. Chatham, Kent: New Voice, 1963
- Jazz poems. London: Vista Books, 1963
- & (And) it is a song : poems. Birmingham: Migrant Press, 1965
- Faces & Forms: Poems. London: Ambit, 1965
- Word from the North : new poetry from Finland, edited, translated and introduction by Anselm Hollo. Blackburn London : Lancs., Poetmeat: Strangers Press, 1965
- The claim. London: Goliard Press, 1966
- Maya. Cape Goliard Press. 1970. ISBN 978-0-670-46347-3.
- Alembic, Trigram Press (distributed by Allison and Busby, 1972
- Sojourner Microcosms: New & Selected Poems 1959–1977. Blue Wind Press. January 1977. ISBN 978-0-912652-39-9.
- Finite Continued, Blue Wind Press, 1980 (ISBN 0-912652-68-3)
- Corvus: poems. Coffee House Press. 1995. ISBN 978-1-56689-039-7.
- Notes on the Possibilities and Attractions of Existence: Selected Poems 1965–2000. Coffee House Press. 2001. ISBN 978-1-56689-113-4.

=== Anthologies ===
- Michael Horovitz, ed. (1969). Children of Albion: Poetry of the Underground in Britain. Penguin Books.
- Edward Lucie-Smith, ed. (1970). British Poetry since 1945. Penguin.
- Jon Silkin, ed. (1973). Poetry of the Committed Individual. Penguin. ISBN 0-14-042159-9.

== See also ==
- The Czar's Madman
