= Water gel explosive =

Fuel-sensitized explosive mixture

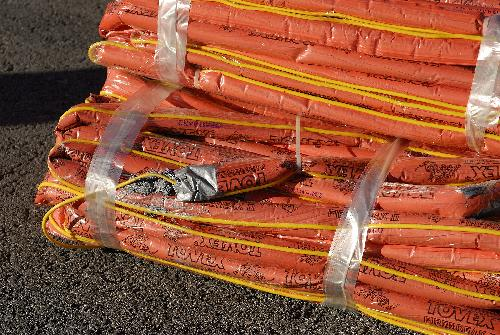
Tovex, a form of water gel explosive.

A water-gel explosive is a fuel-sensitized explosive mixture consisting of an aqueous ammonium nitrate solution that acts as the oxidizer. Water gels that are cap-insensitive are referred to under United States safety regulations as blasting agents. Water gel explosives have a jelly-like consistency and come in sausage-like packing stapled shut on both sides.

Water-gel explosives have almost completely displaced dynamite, becoming the most-used civil blasting agents.

== Composition ==
Water gels usually have many different ingredients. They contain a gelatinizing agent, also known as a thickener, that modifies their consistency, ranging from easily pourable gels to hard solids. Polyvinyl alcohol, guar gum, dextran gums, and urea-formaldehyde resins are the typical gelling agents. Guar, specifically, is a gelling agent used for the aqueous portion of the water gel explosives. The primary component of water gels is methylamine nitrate. Methylamine nitrate is the salt formed by the neutralization of methylamine with nitric acid. Water gel explosives are also made of ammonium nitrate, calcium nitrate, aluminum, ethylene glycol and TNT. The proportions of these components vary depending on the desired explosiveness of the water gel.

== Preparation ==
Water gel explosives are produced by combining nitroparaffins, usually nitromethane, with an aqueous salt solution and a gelling agent. These nitroparaffins typically make up most of the water gel explosive. Different types of gelling agents are used to create the water gel explosive. One agent is insoluble in water, but able to gel with nitromethane. The gel used for nitromethane is cyanoethylether, a derivative of galactomannan gum. Other agents are water-soluble and are used for the aqueous salt solution. As mentioned above, water-soluble gums and gel modifiers (like guar) can be used for the gelling of aqueous solutions. When the salt solution and nitroparaffin are gelled, the entire mixture is combined and mixed together until the desired consistency is achieved. One characteristic that allows the explosive to work so well is the insoluble nature of the nitroparaffin. The effectiveness of the water gels is dependent on the dissemination of salts in the salt solution. The particles need to be very small and fine so that they can be dispersed well throughout the solution. Some salts that are commonly used include: ammonium nitrate, sodium nitrate, sodium perchlorate and potassium chlorate. The sensitivity of the explosive must be increased in order to improve the initiation of the detonation of the explosive. There are different techniques for increasing the sensitivity. Aluminum or other powdered metals can help increase the sensitivity of the water gel, but increasing the sensitivity also means that the explosives are more combustible. Powdered metals have not proven to be completely effective in increasing the sensitivity of the explosive because they do not uniformly mix through the solution. They also lose sensitivity as storage time increases. Liquid non-self-explosive sensitizers like nitrobenzene and liquid nitrotoluene have not worked well either because they are difficult to hold in suspension. Liquid aliphatic mononitrates have been found to work very effectively as sensitizers when they are well mixed in the water gel.

== Advantages and uses ==
Water gel explosives tend to be less toxic and are less hazardous than dynamite to manufacture, transport, and store. Water gels are also less expensive than conventional explosives. Because they are relatively safe and easy to use, they are often used in the mining industry. There are many different types of water gel explosives for use in different situations. One type, a small diameter slurry explosive, can be used specifically for blasting in coal undercut, midcut, and depillaring areas. They are preferable to nitroglycerin-based explosives like dynamite because they produce less noxious fumes.

Water gel explosives are frequently used as cartridge explosives because they are much easier to load into large casings. With water gel explosives, the slurry material can simply be poured into the casing. Traditional explosives are cast into the casing. This process is laborious and the charge may begin to shrink, creating multiple voids. A final advantage of slurry is that it can be stored in non-explosive component form and sensitized into field-manufactured explosive as it is needed. The explosive may be sensitized by the addition of gas, metal powder, or another explosive such as TNT, RDX, HMX, or PETN. The water in water gel explosives is converted into a reactant by the addition of large amounts of aluminum.
