= Racing fuel =

Racing fuel can refer to many different common fuels used in motorsports:

- Leaded gasoline, formerly used by the NASCAR series and other motorsports
  - Use of leaded gasoline in NASCAR
- Nitromethane and methanol fuel, used by Top Fuel drag racing
- Methanol fuel, formerly used in some open-wheel race cars, like IndyCar Series prior to 2007 and in Top Alcohol drag racing
- Ethanol fuel, now being used in the IndyCar Series and NASCAR
- Nitrous, used by drag racing vehicles to increase horsepower
