= Methylammonium nitrate =

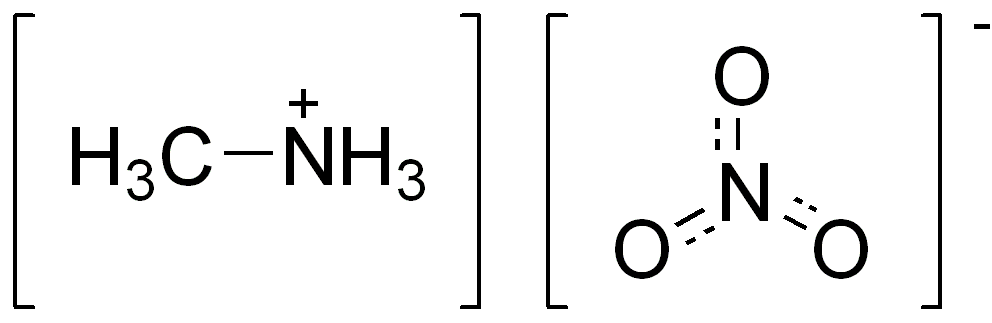

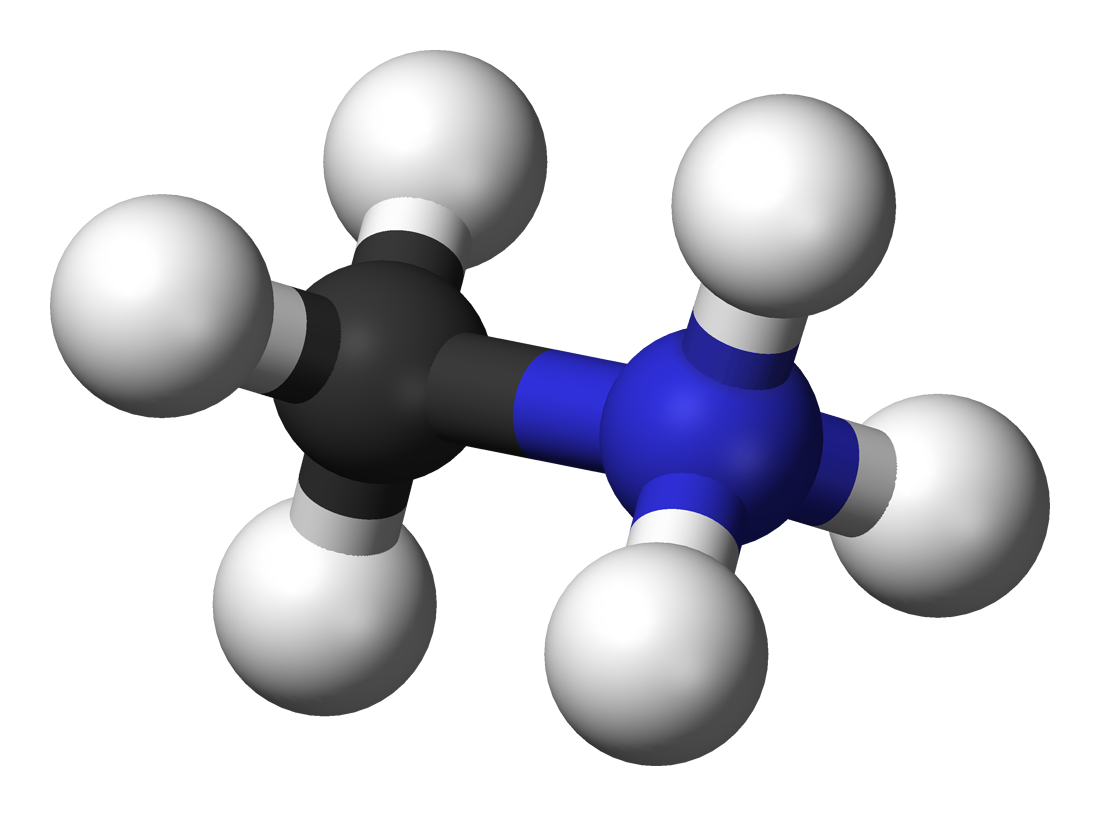
Ball-and-stick model of the methylammonium cation
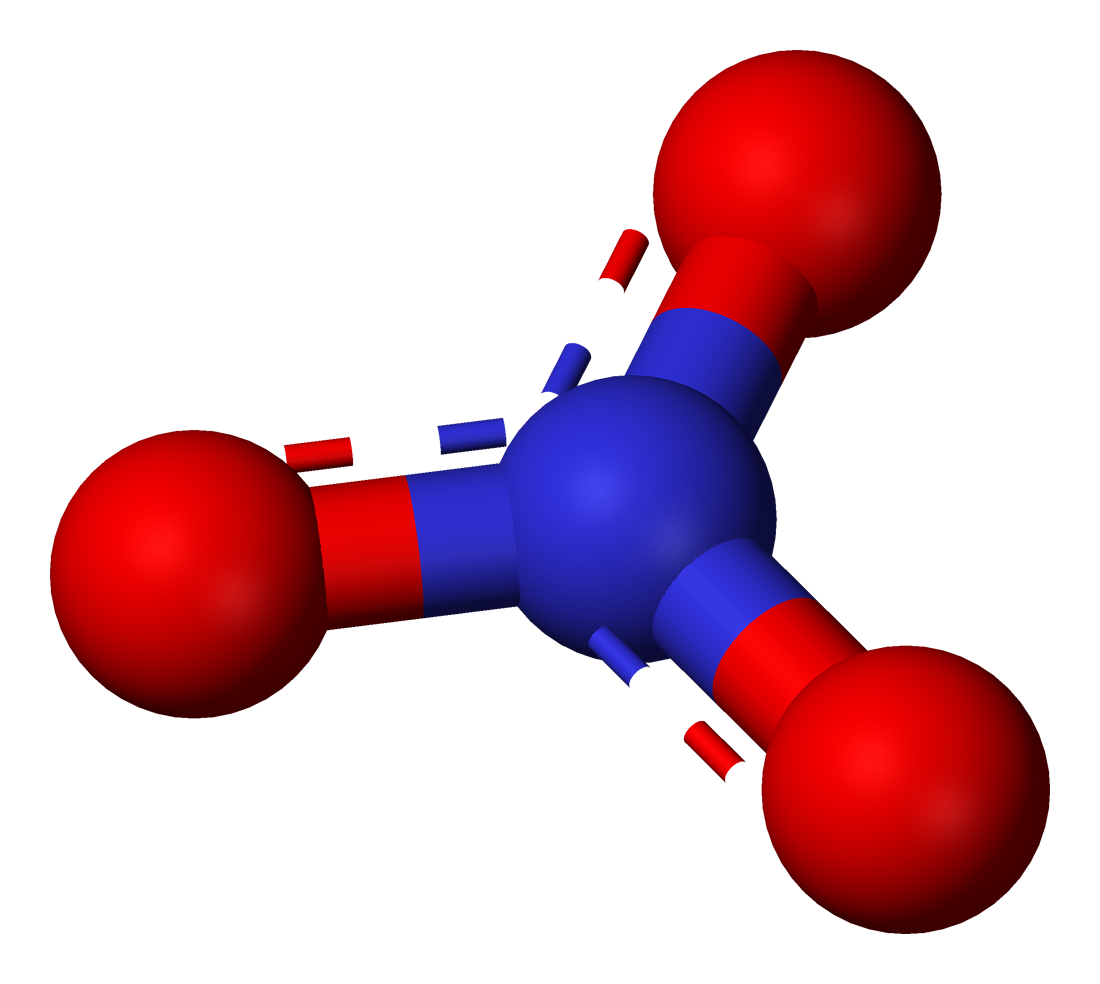
Ball-and-stick model of the nitrate anion

Names
- IUPAC name methylammonium nitrate
- Other names Methylamine nitrate Monomethylamine nitrate Monomethylammonium nitrate MMAN

Identifiers
CAS Number	22113-87-7
3D model (JSmol)	Interactive image
ChemSpider	9063095
ECHA InfoCard	100.040.701
PubChem CID	10887831
CompTox Dashboard (EPA)	DTXSID3047924
- InChI: InChI=1S/CH5N.NO3/c1-2;2-1(3)4/h2H2,1H3;/q;-1/p+1 Key: WPHINMYYTFDPIA-UHFFFAOYSA-O; InChI=1/CH5N.NO3/c1-2;2-1(3)4/h2H2,1H3;/q;-1/p+1 Key: WPHINMYYTFDPIA-IKLDFBCSAW
- SMILES: C[NH3+].[N+](=O)([O-])[O-]

Properties
Chemical formula	CH_{6}N_{2}O_{3}
Molar mass	94.07 g/mol

Related compounds
Other cations	Ammonium nitrate Hydroxylammonium nitrate Ethylammonium nitrate
- Except where otherwise noted, data are given for materials in their standard state (at 25 °C [77 °F], 100 kPa). verify (what is ?) Infobox references

Methylammonium nitrate is an explosive chemical with the molecular formula CH_{6}N_{2}O_{3}, alternately CH_{3}NH_{3}^{+}NO_{3}^{−}. It is the salt formed by the neutralization of methylamine with nitric acid. This substance is also known as methylamine nitrate and monomethylamine nitrate, not to be confused with methyl nitramine or monomethyl nitramine.

Methylammonium nitrate was first used as an explosive ingredient by the Germans during World War II. It was originally called mono-methylamine nitrate, a name that has largely stuck among chemists who formulate energetic materials.

Methylammonium nitrate is somewhat similar in explosive properties to ammonium nitrate (AN) which yields 85% of the power of nitroglycerine when the ammonium nitrate is incorporated into an explosive. The addition of the carbon-containing methyl group in methylammonium nitrate imparts better explosive properties and helps create a more favorable oxygen balance.

After World War II, methylammonium nitrate was largely ignored by explosives manufacturers, in favor of less-costly ammonium nitrate. Ammonium nitrate-fuel oil mixtures (ANFO) were sufficient for most large-diameter explosives uses.

Methylammonium nitrate saw a resurgence when E. I. du Pont de Nemours and Company (DuPont), seeking to lower the cost of its TNT-based Tovex water-gel explosives, incorporated a mixture of methylammonium nitrate with ammonium nitrate which served as a basis for DuPont's water-gels manufactured under the names "Tovex Extra" and "Pourvex Extra". Methylammonium nitrate, also known as PR-M (which stands for "Potomac River—Mono-methylamine nitrate") soon was seen as the possible path toward creating a low-cost blasting agent (water gel explosives) that might replace the explosives based on nitroglycerin (dynamites).

In late 1973, DuPont started to phase out dynamite and replace it with water-gels based on PR-M. However, PR-M proved to have unusual "mass effects". That is, if there was sufficient mass, under certain conditions, PR-M could explode without warning. On August 6, 1974, a tank car containing PR-M blew up in Wenatchee, Washington, rail yard, killing two and injuring 66 others. On July 4, 1976, a PR-M storage with 60,000 pounds (approximately 27,200Kg) of PR-M detonated at DuPont's Potomac River Works at Martinsburg, WV. Though there was no loss of life, there were many injuries and a substantial loss of property.
