= Juho August Hollo =

Finnish scholar (1885–1967)

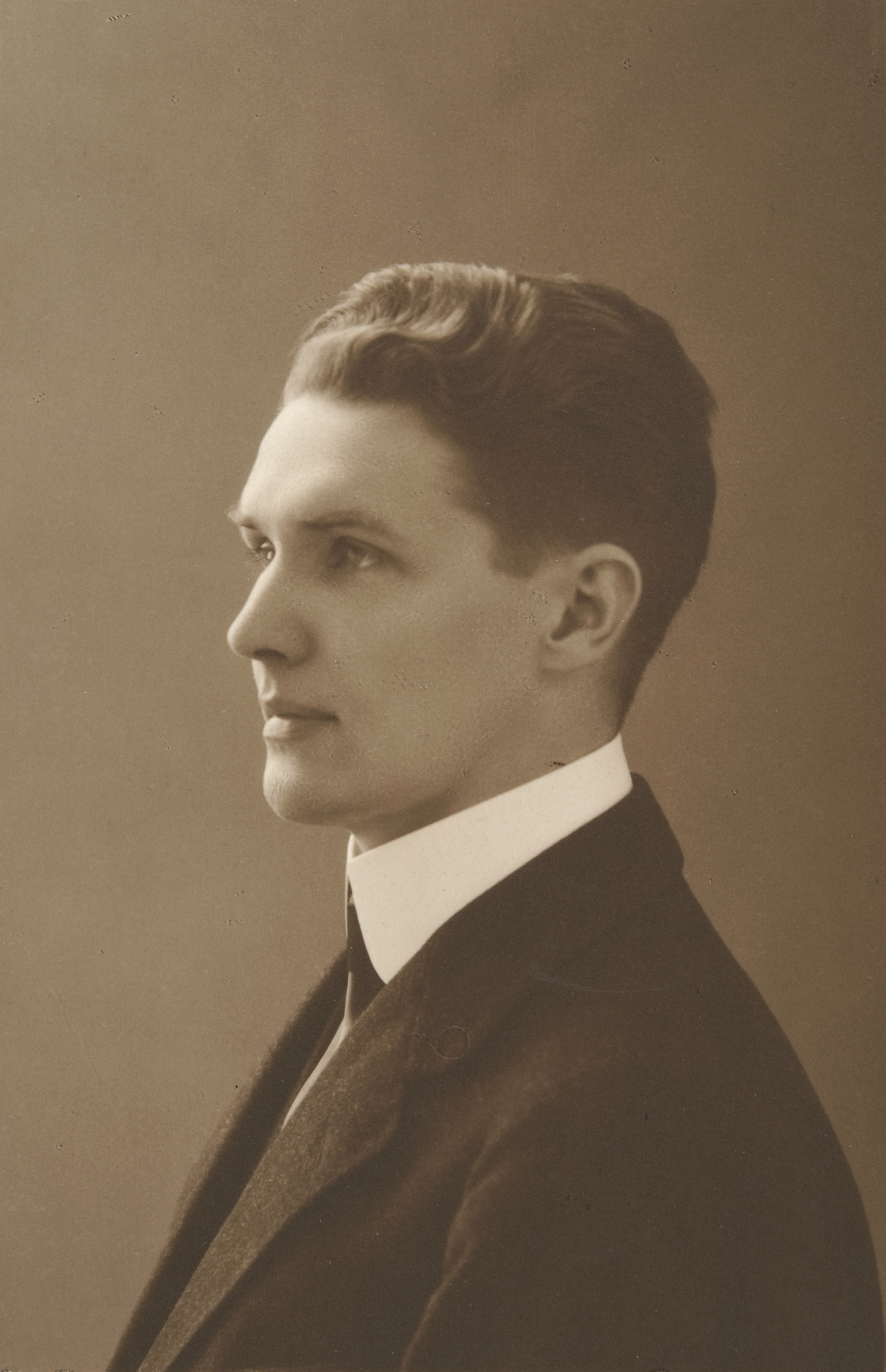
- J. A. Hollo
- Born: 17 January 1885; Laihia,Grand Duchy of Finland, Russian Empire
- Died: 22 January 1967 (aged 82); Helsinki, Finland
- Occupations: Translator; essayist; professor
- Children: Anselm Hollo

Juho August Hollo (17 January 1885, in Laihia – 22 January 1967, in Helsinki), also known as J. A. Hollo, was a Finnish scholar and professor of education at the University of Helsinki from 1930 to 1954.

He was one of the most prolific translators into Finnish, translating a range of genres and from several languages. He himself said in 1953 that he had translated 170 books; some sources list over 300. Among the authors he translated were Miguel de Cervantes, Anatole France, Gustave Flaubert, Stendhal, Voltaire, Charles Dickens, Jonathan Swift, Johann Wolfgang von Goethe, Fyodor Dostoevsky, Leo Tolstoy, Knut Hamsun and Friedrich Nietzsche. He was also an essayist.

He worked as a teacher from 1908 to 1919. In 1920 he became docent at the University of Helsinki, but then spent five years in Leipzig and Vienna. He returned to Helsinki in 1930 and became professor at his alma mater, and from 1950 to 1954 was the chancellor of Yhteiskunnallinen korkeakoulu (Civic College).

He was married to Antonina Anna Walden (1899–1983), daughter of organic chemist Paul Walden. His sons were the poet and translator Anselm Hollo and environmental law scholar Erkki Hollo, a justice of the Supreme Administrative Court and professor at the University of Helsinki.
