= Tokugawa (surname) =

Tokugawa (Shinjitai spelling: 徳川; Kyūjitai spelling: 德川) is a surname in Japan literally meaning "virtuous river".

It originated with Tokugawa Ieyasu, who took the surname in 1567, reviving an ancestral placename. He and his fourteen successors were shōguns during the Edo period of Japanese history. Some of his sons also bore the Tokugawa surname, and three cadet branches of his line, the Owari, Kii, and Mito Tokugawa, continued as daimyōs through the Edo period. Descendants of Ieyasu who were not permitted to take the Tokugawa name normally bore the Matsudaira surname.

== See also ==
- Tokugawa clan
- Category:Tokugawa clan
